= Aamse =

Village in Estonia

- Village
- Location within Estonia
- Coordinates: 58°55′37″N 23°42′47″E
- Country: Estonia
- County: Lääne County
- Municipality: Haapsalu

Population (2000)
  - Total: 7
- Time zone: UTC+2 (EET)
  - Summer (DST): UTC+3 (EEST)

Aamse is a small village in Haapsalu municipality, Lääne County, in western Estonia. It is located to the east of the town of Haapsalu, between the villages of Tammiku and Taebla. Prior to the 2017 administrative reform of local governments, it was located in Ridala Parish.
