= Hobulaiu =

Village in Estonia

Coordinates: 58°56′19″N 23°23′6″E

- Village
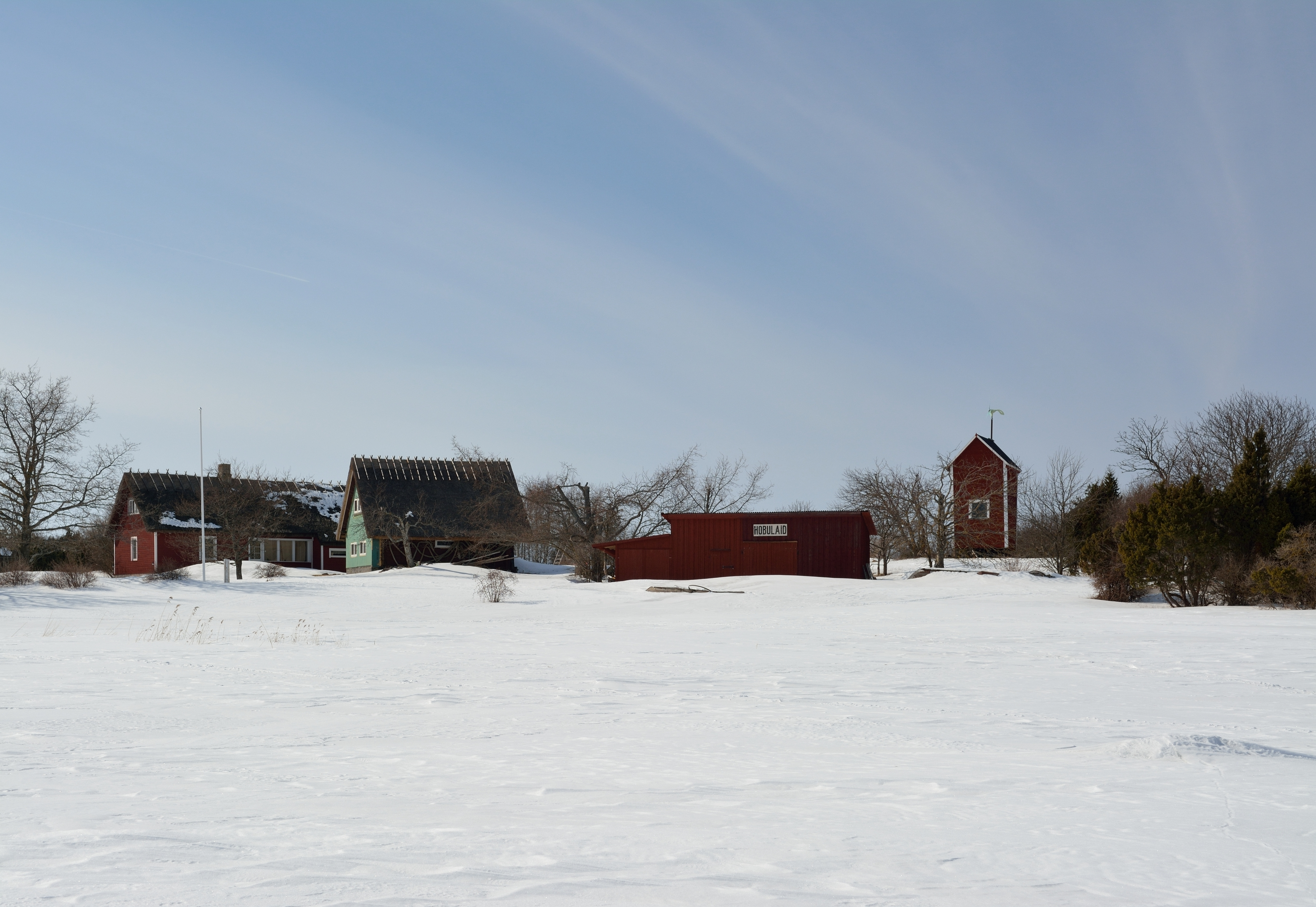
- Interactive map of Hobulaiu
- Country: Estonia
- County: Lääne County
- Municipality: Haapsalu
- Time zone: UTC+2 (EET)
  - Summer (DST): UTC+3 (EEST)

Hobulaiu is a village in Haapsalu municipality, Lääne County, in western Estonia, on the island Hobulaid. Prior to the 2017 administrative reform of local governments, it was located in Ridala Parish.
