= Paralepa =

Borough in Estonia

- Small borough
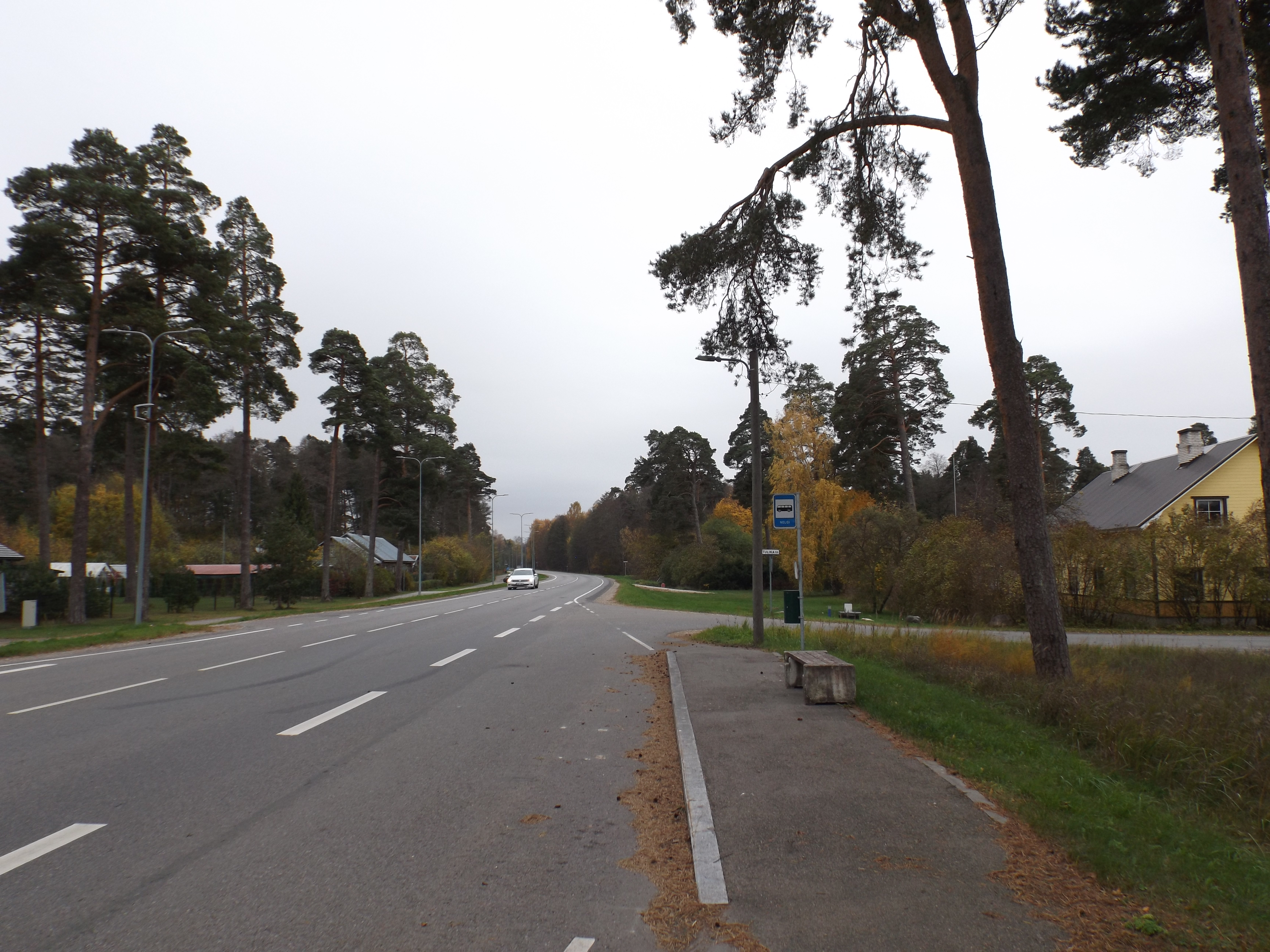

- Location in Estonia
- Coordinates: 58°55′46″N 23°31′32″E
- Country: Estonia
- County: Lääne County
- Municipality: Haapsalu

Population (2011 Census)
  - Total: 306

Paralepa is a small borough (Estonian: alevik) in Haapsalu municipality, Lääne County, western Estonia. As of the 2011 census, the settlement's population was 306. Prior to the 2017 administrative reform of local governments, it was located in Ridala Parish.
