= Kiviküla, Lääne County =

Village in Estonia

Coordinates: 58°51′17″N 23°30′38″E

Kiviküla
- Village
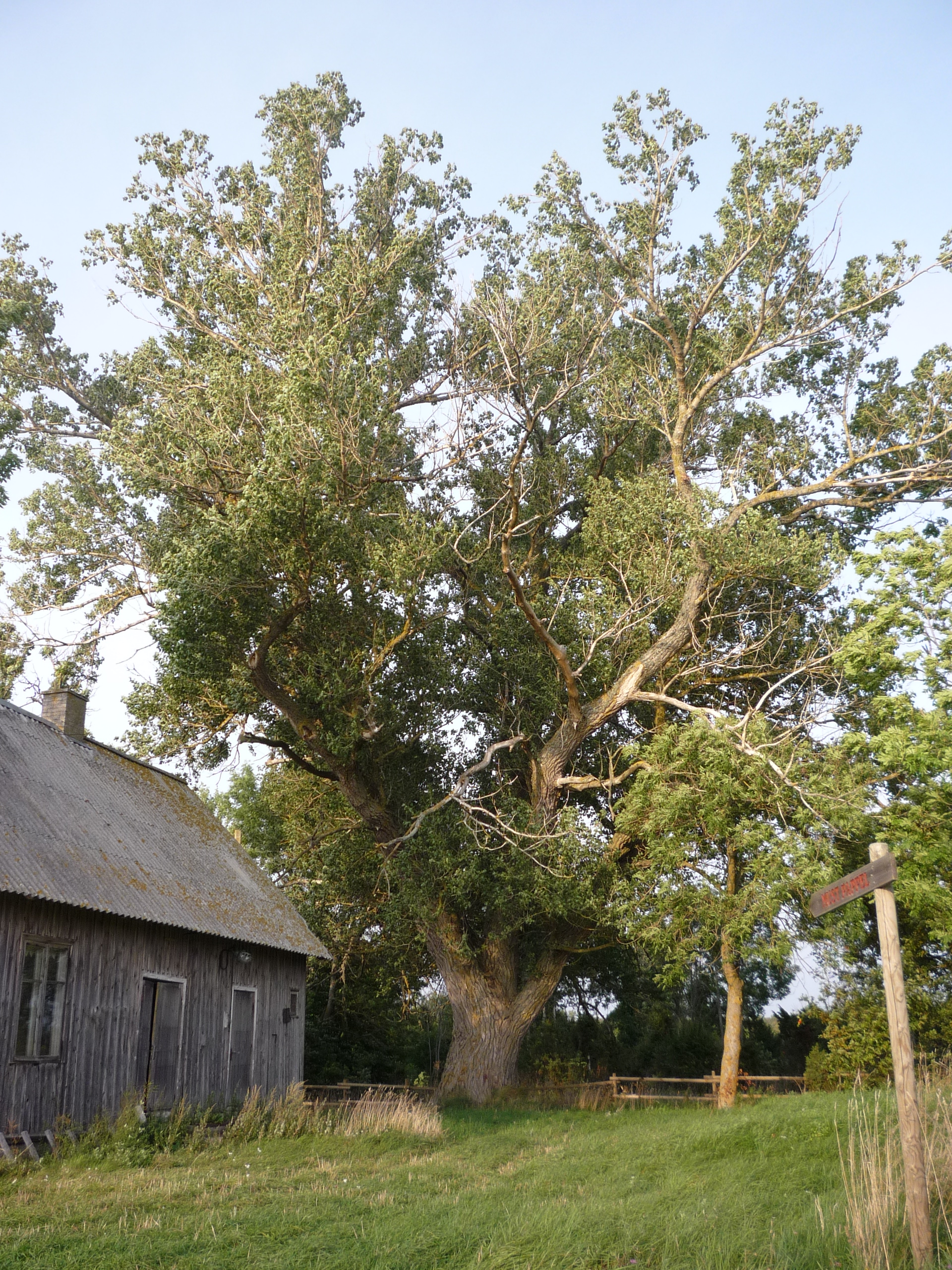
- Interactive map of Kiviküla
- Country: Estonia
- County: Lääne
- Municipality: Haapsalu
- Time zone: UTC+2 (EET)
  - Summer (DST): UTC+3 (EEST)

Kiviküla is a village in Haapsalu municipality, Lääne County, in western Estonia. Prior to the 2017 administrative reform of local governments, it was located in Ridala Parish.
