= Väike-Ahli =

Village in Estonia

Coordinates: 58°53′N 23°32′E

- Village
- Interactive map of Väike-Ahli
- Country: Estonia
- County: Lääne County
- Municipality: Haapsalu
- Time zone: UTC+2 (EET)
  - Summer (DST): UTC+3 (EEST)

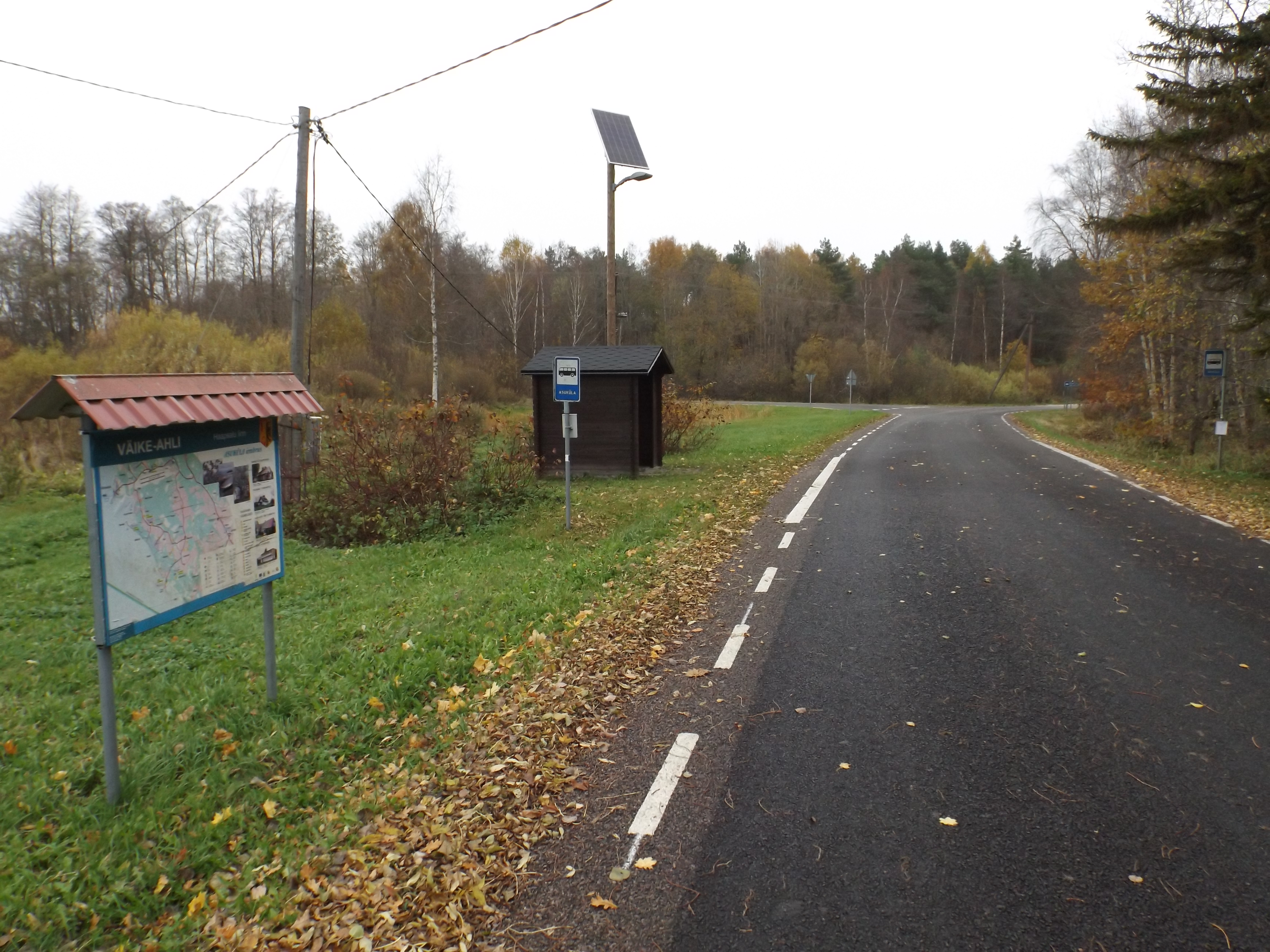
Bus stop in Väike-Ahli village, 2024

Väike-Ahli is a village in Haapsalu municipality, Lääne County, in western Estonia. Prior to the 2017 administrative reform of local governments, it was located in Ridala Parish.
