= Kadaka, Lääne County =

Village in Estonia

Coordinates: 58°56′31″N 23°38′40″E

Kadaka
- Village
- Interactive map of Kadaka
- Country: Estonia
- County: Lääne County
- Municipality: Haapsalu
- Time zone: UTC+2 (EET)
  - Summer (DST): UTC+3 (EEST)

Kadaka is a village in Haapsalu municipality, Lääne County, in western Estonia. Prior to the 2017 administrative reform of local governments, it was located in Ridala Parish.
