= Panga, Lääne County =

Village in Estonia

Panga
- Village
- Location in Estonia Panga (Europe)
- Coordinates: 58.8303389°N 23.5807099°E
- Country: Estonia
- County: Lääne County
- Municipality: Haapsalu

Population
  - Total: 290
- Time zone: UTC+2 (EET)
  - Summer (DST): UTC+3 (EEST)

Panga is a village in Haapsalu municipality, Lääne County, in western Estonia. Prior to the 2017 administrative reform of local governments, it was located in Ridala Parish.

There is basic school (Ridala põhikool).
