= Metsaküla, Lääne County =

Village in Estonia

Coordinates: 58°50′55″N 23°31′52″E

Metsaküla
- Village
- Interactive map of Metsaküla
- Country: Estonia
- County: Lääne County
- Municipality: Haapsalu
- Time zone: UTC+2 (EET)
  - Summer (DST): UTC+3 (EEST)

Metsaküla is a village in Haapsalu municipality, Lääne County, in western Estonia. Prior to the 2017 administrative reform of local governments, it was located in Ridala Parish.
