= Põgari-Sassi =

Village in Estonia

- Village
- Location within Estonia
- Coordinates: 58°48′N 23°31′E
- Country: Estonia
- County: Lääne County
- Municipality: Haapsalu
- Time zone: UTC+2 (EET)
  - Summer (DST): UTC+3 (EEST)

Põgari-Sassi is a village in Haapsalu municipality, Lääne County, in western Estonia. Prior to the 2017 administrative reform of local governments, it was located in Ridala Parish. It has 2 bus stops.

== History ==
On 22 September 1944 the last session of the Otto Tief's cabinet took place in the house of prayer in Põgari. Later the Secretary of State Helmut Maandi escaped through Tauksi, Liialaid and the Hiiumaa Islets to Sweden.

== Gallery ==
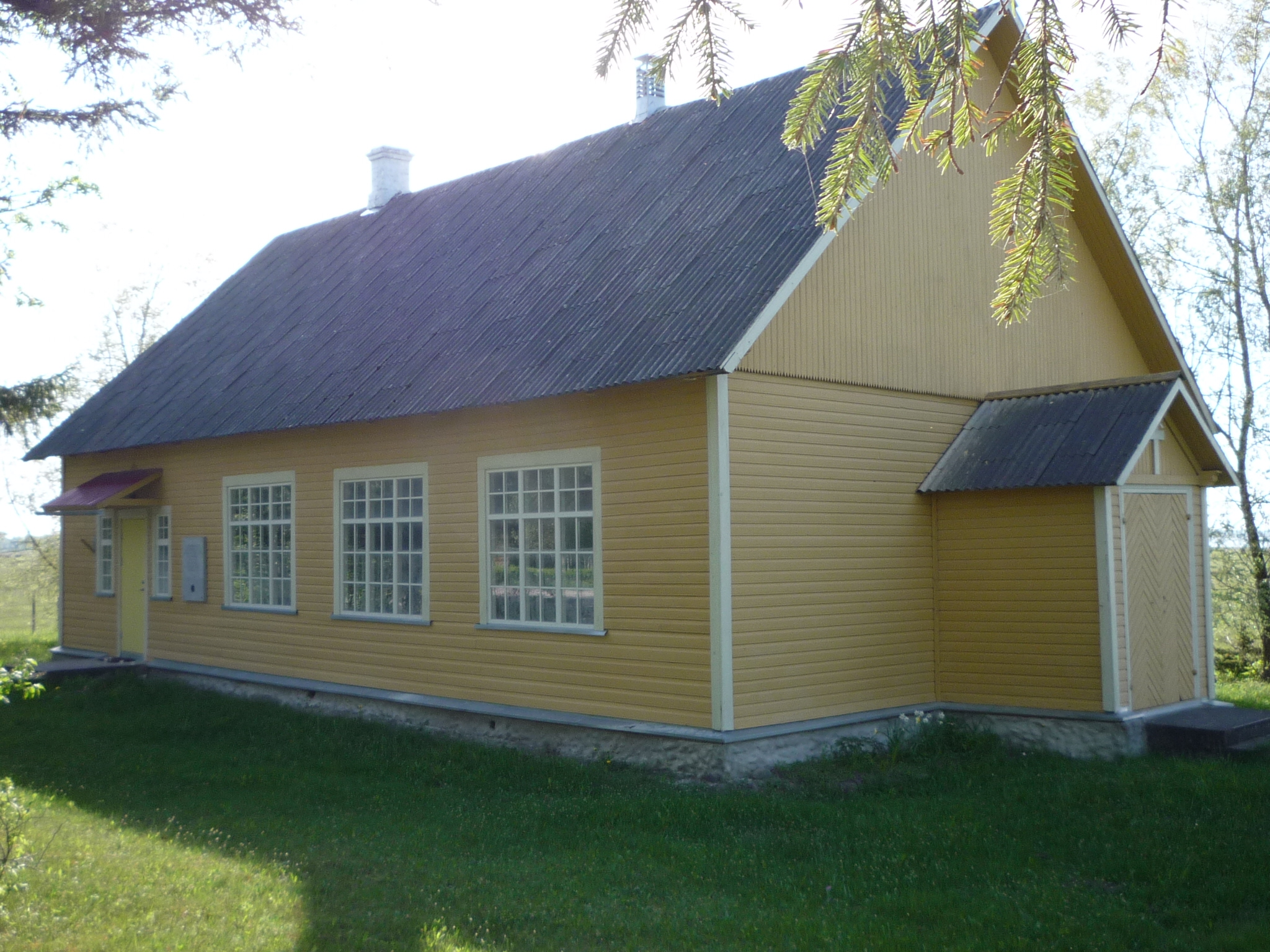
Põgari house of prayer

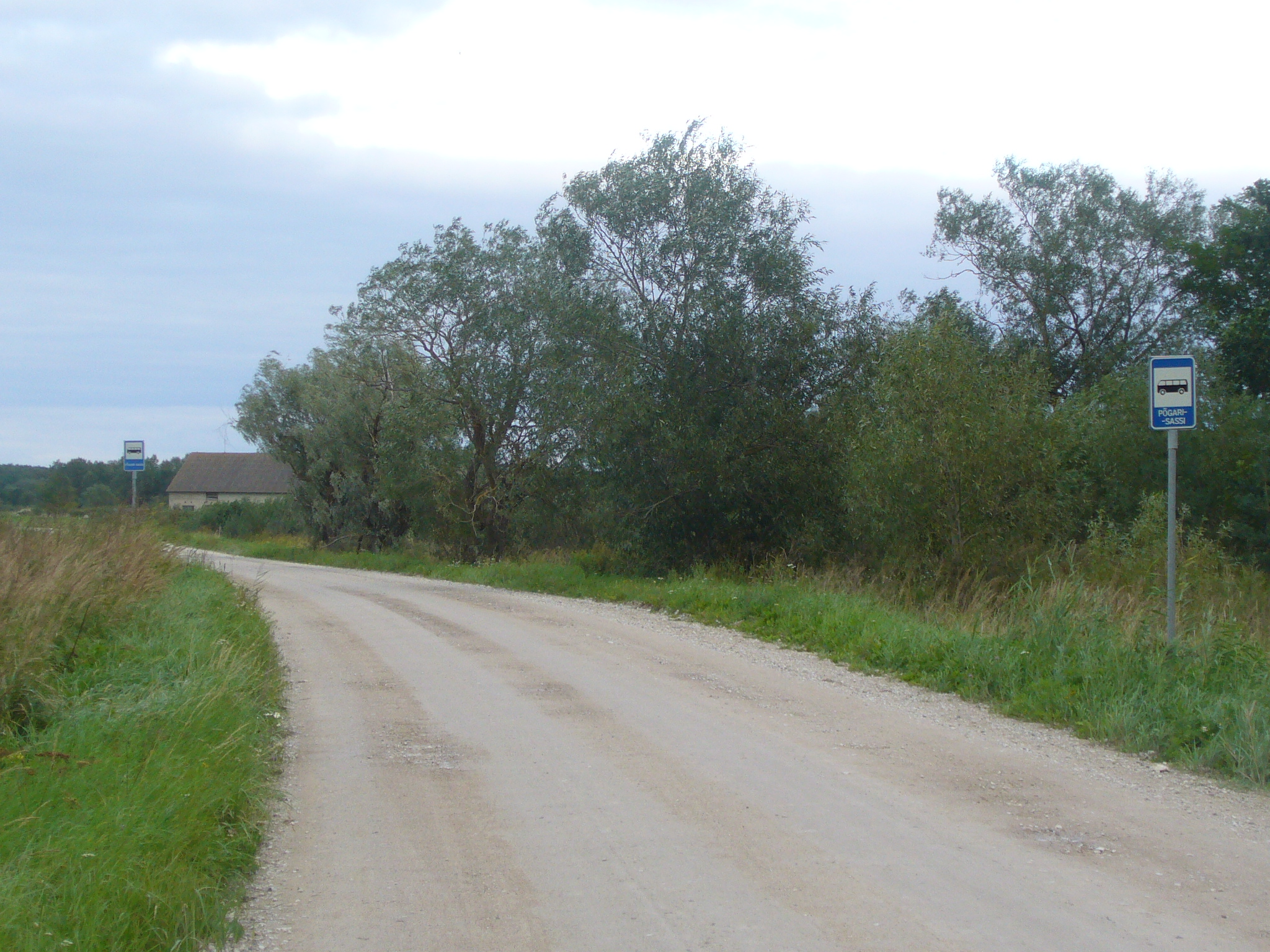
Põgari-Sassi bus stop
