= Kiltsi, Lääne County =

Village in Estonia

Coordinates: 58°55′18″N 23°31′08″E

Kiltsi
- Village
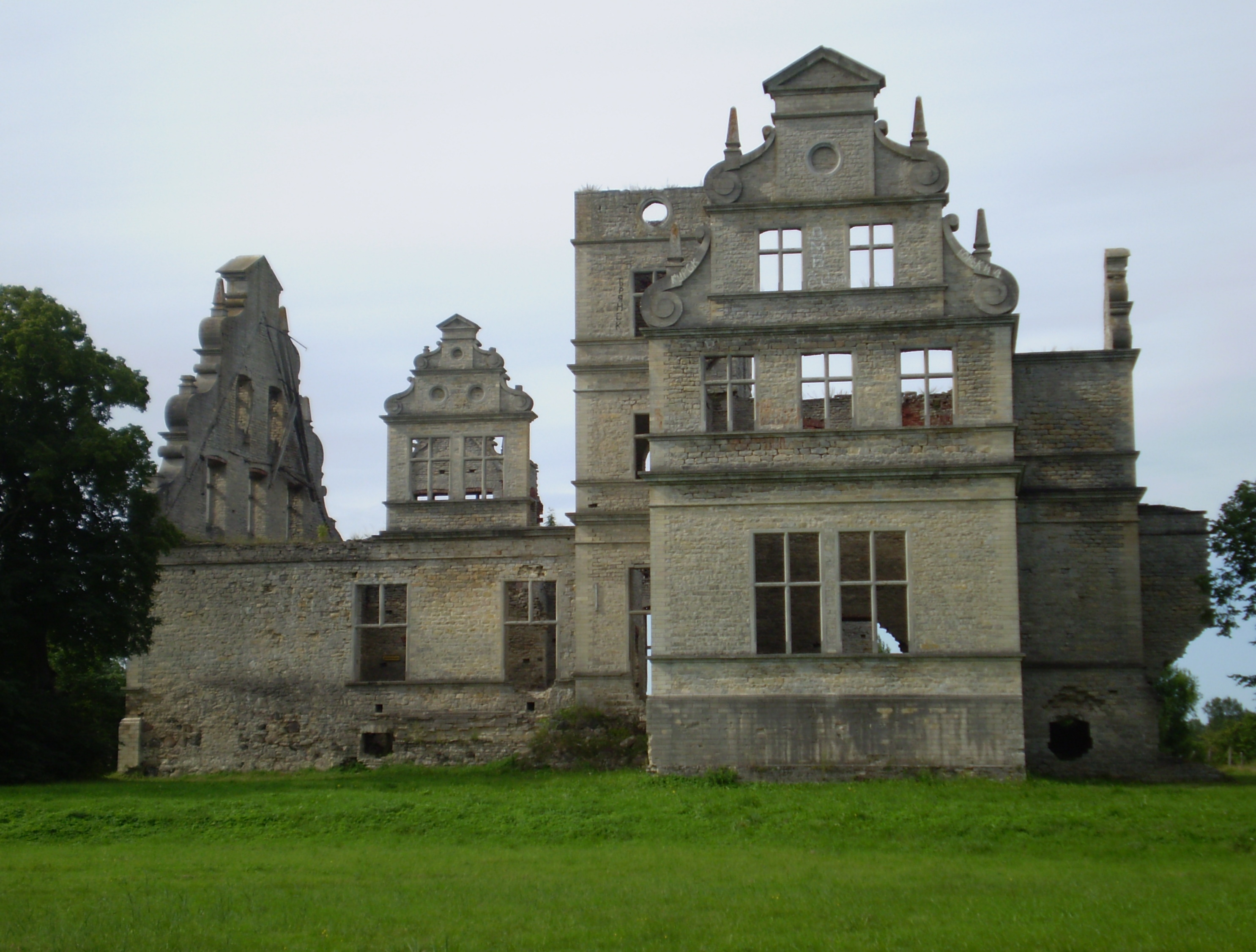
- Ruins of Ungru Manor in Kiltsi.
- Interactive map of Kiltsi
- Country: Estonia
- County: Lääne County
- Municipality: Haapsalu
- Time zone: UTC+2 (EET)
  - Summer (DST): UTC+3 (EEST)

Kiltsi is a village in Haapsalu municipality, Lääne County, in western Estonia. It is situated southwest to the town of Haapsalu, harbour village Rohuküla is located west to Kiltsi. Prior to the 2017 administrative reform of local governments, it was located in Ridala Parish.

Haapsalu Airfield (ICAO: EEHU) is located in Kiltsi.

== Gallery ==
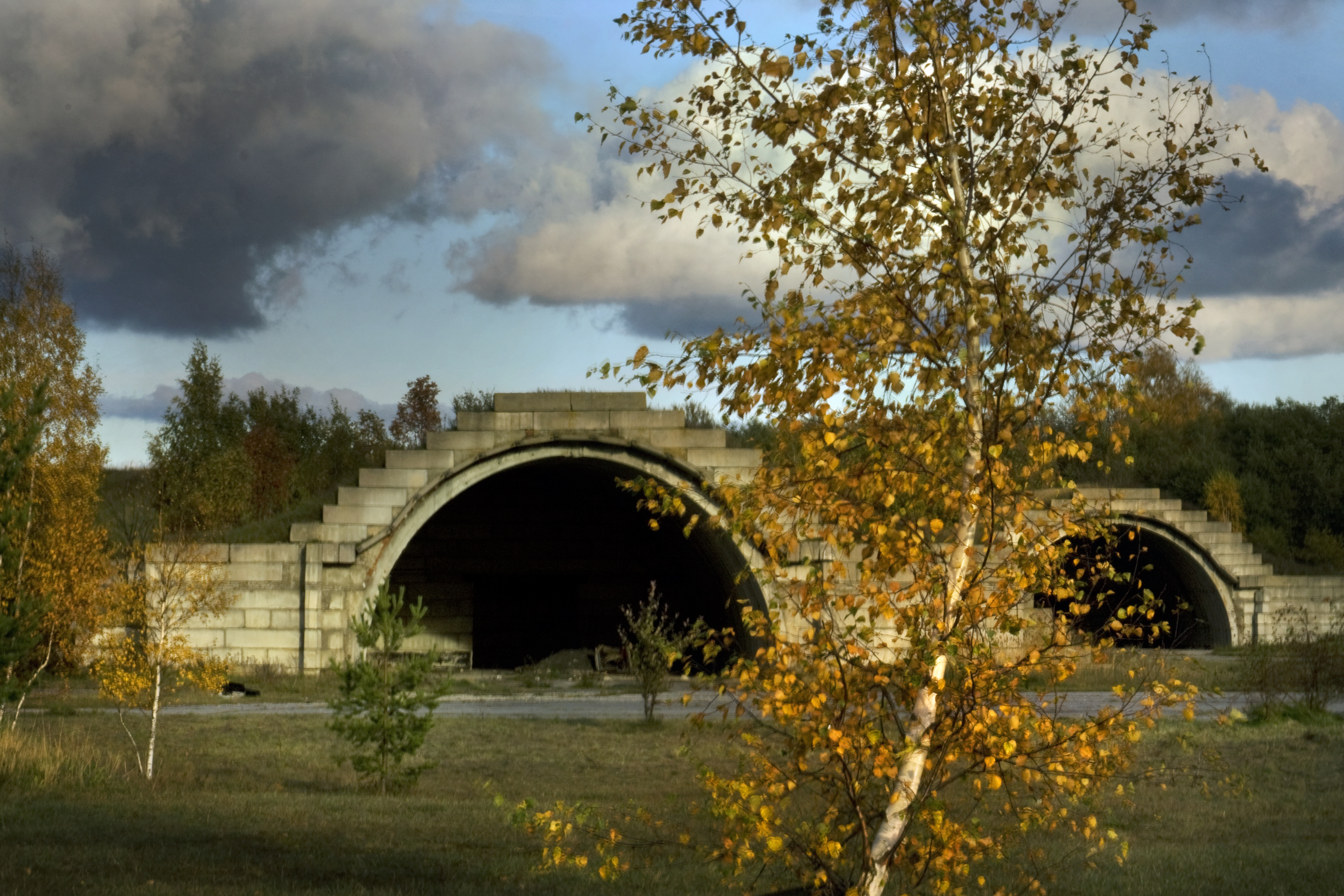
Hangars in Kiltsi (Haapsalu) airfield

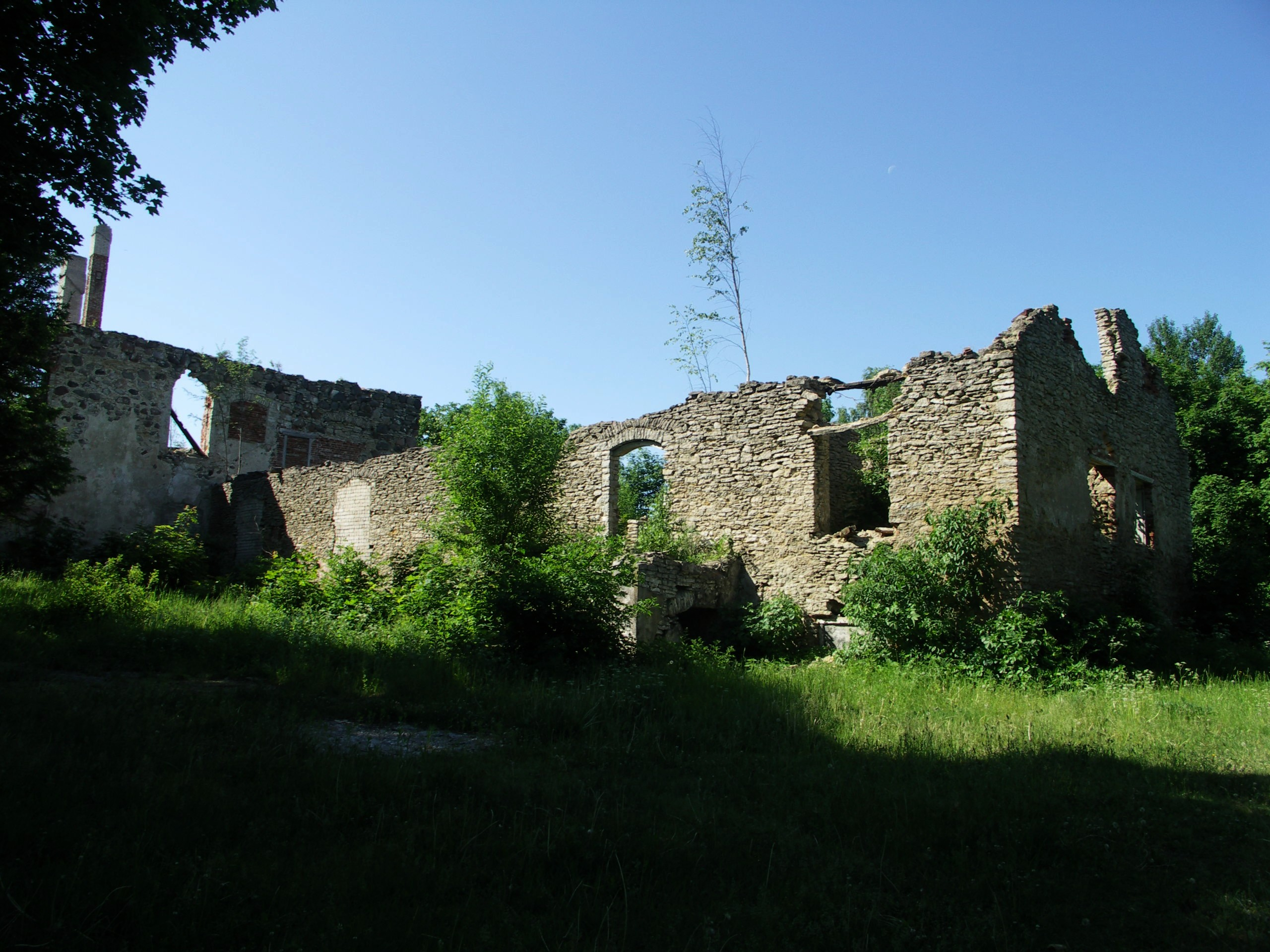
Kiltsi Manor
