= Erja, Lääne County =

Village in Estonia

Coordinates: 58°54′N 23°40′E

Erja
- Village
- Interactive map of Erja
- Country: Estonia
- County: Lääne County
- Municipality: Haapsalu
- Time zone: UTC+2 (EET)
  - Summer (DST): UTC+3 (EEST)

Erja is a village situated in Haapsalu municipality, which is located in Lääne County, in western Estonia. Prior to the 2017 administrative reform of local governments, it was located in Ridala Parish.
