= Emmuvere =

Village in Estonia

Coordinates: 58°51′N 23°34′E

- Village
- Interactive map of Emmuvere
- Country: Estonia
- County: Lääne County
- Municipality: Haapsalu
- Time zone: UTC+2 (EET)
  - Summer (DST): UTC+3 (EEST)

Emmuvere is a village in Haapsalu municipality, Lääne County, in western Estonia. Prior to the 2017 administrative reform of local governments, it was located in Ridala Parish.
