= Uuemõisa (borough) =

Borough in Estonia

- Small borough
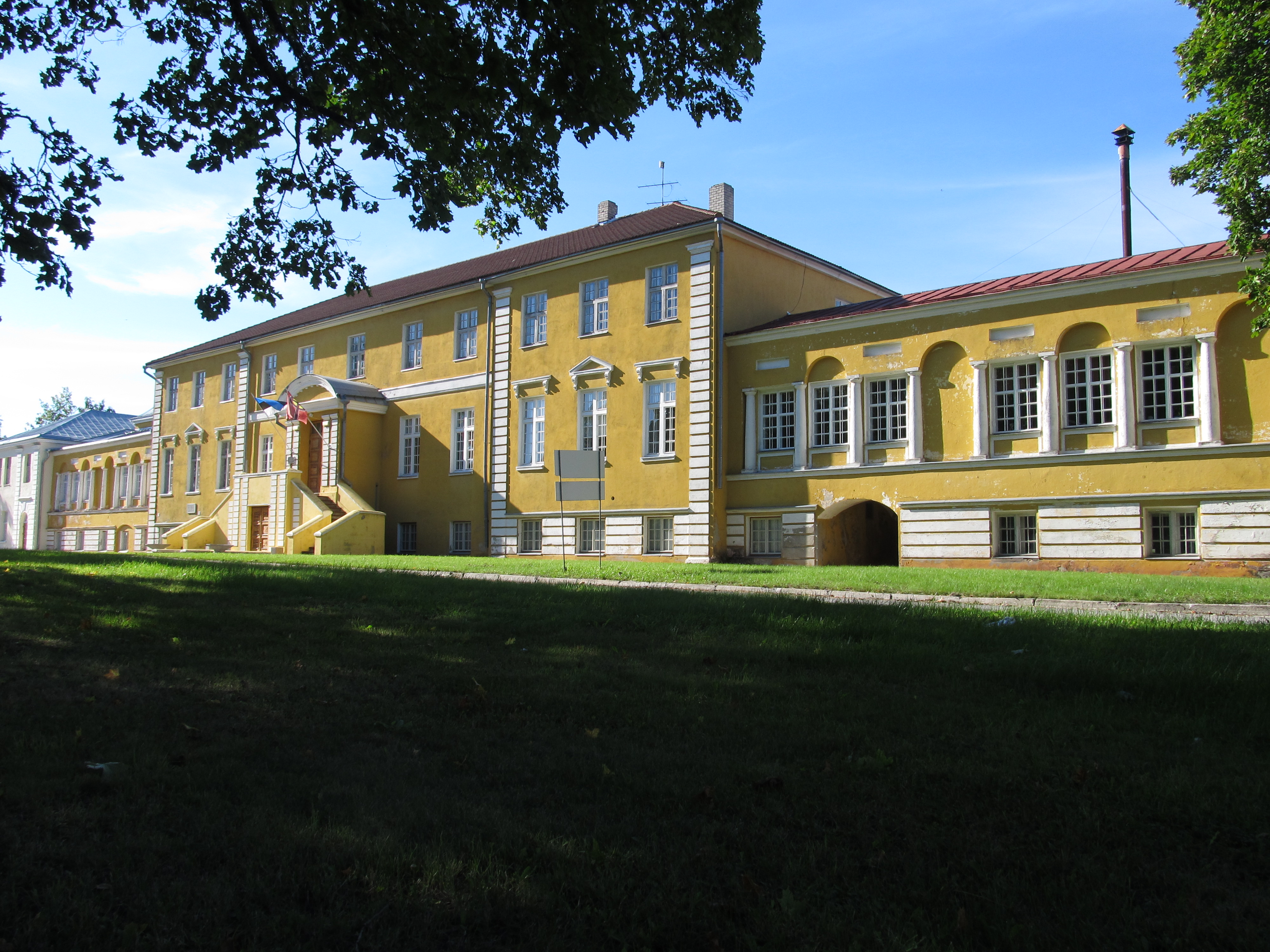
- Uuemõisa manor

- Location in Estonia
- Coordinates: 58°56′26″N 23°34′49″E
- Country: Estonia
- County: Lääne County
- Municipality: Haapsalu

Population (2010)
  - Total: 1,069

Uuemõisa is a small borough (Estonian: alevik) in Haapsalu municipality, Lääne County, western Estonia, located just east of the town of Haapsalu. Prior to the 2017 administrative reform of local governments, Uuemõisa was the administrative centre of Ridala Parish. Uuemõisa has a population of 1,069 (as of 2010).

== Uuemõisa manor ==
Uuemõisa estate (German: Neuenhof) is first mentioned in 1539 and then belonged to the Bishopric of Saare-Lääne (German: Ösel-Wiek). During the Swedish time it for a long period of time was a part of the vast domains of the De la Gardie family. The last owner before the Estonian land reform of 1919 was Eugenie Mikhailovna Shakhovskaya, the world's first female fighter pilot. After the Estonian declaration of independence, it was used by the Estonian Ministry of Defence. During the Soviet occupation of Estonia, the Red Army occupied the buildings.

The current manor was built in mid 19th century, with additions made in 1921–23 by architect Karl Burman.
