= Ammuta, Lääne County =

Village in Estonia

Coordinates: 58°50′14″N 23°35′59″E

Ammuta
- Village
- Interactive map of Ammuta
- Country: Estonia
- County: Lääne County
- Municipality: Haapsalu
- Time zone: UTC+2 (EET)
  - Summer (DST): UTC+3 (EEST)

Ammuta is a village in Haapsalu municipality, Lääne County, in western Estonia. Prior to the 2017 administrative reform of local governments, it was located in Ridala Parish.

== Population ==
The village had 31 inhabitants on December 31, 2011 and 25 inhabitants on December 31, 2021.
