= Usse =

Usse may refer to:

- Ussé, a château of the Loire Valley
- Üsse, Estonia

== See also ==
- Uess
- Use (disambiguation)
