= Guest house =

Type of lodging

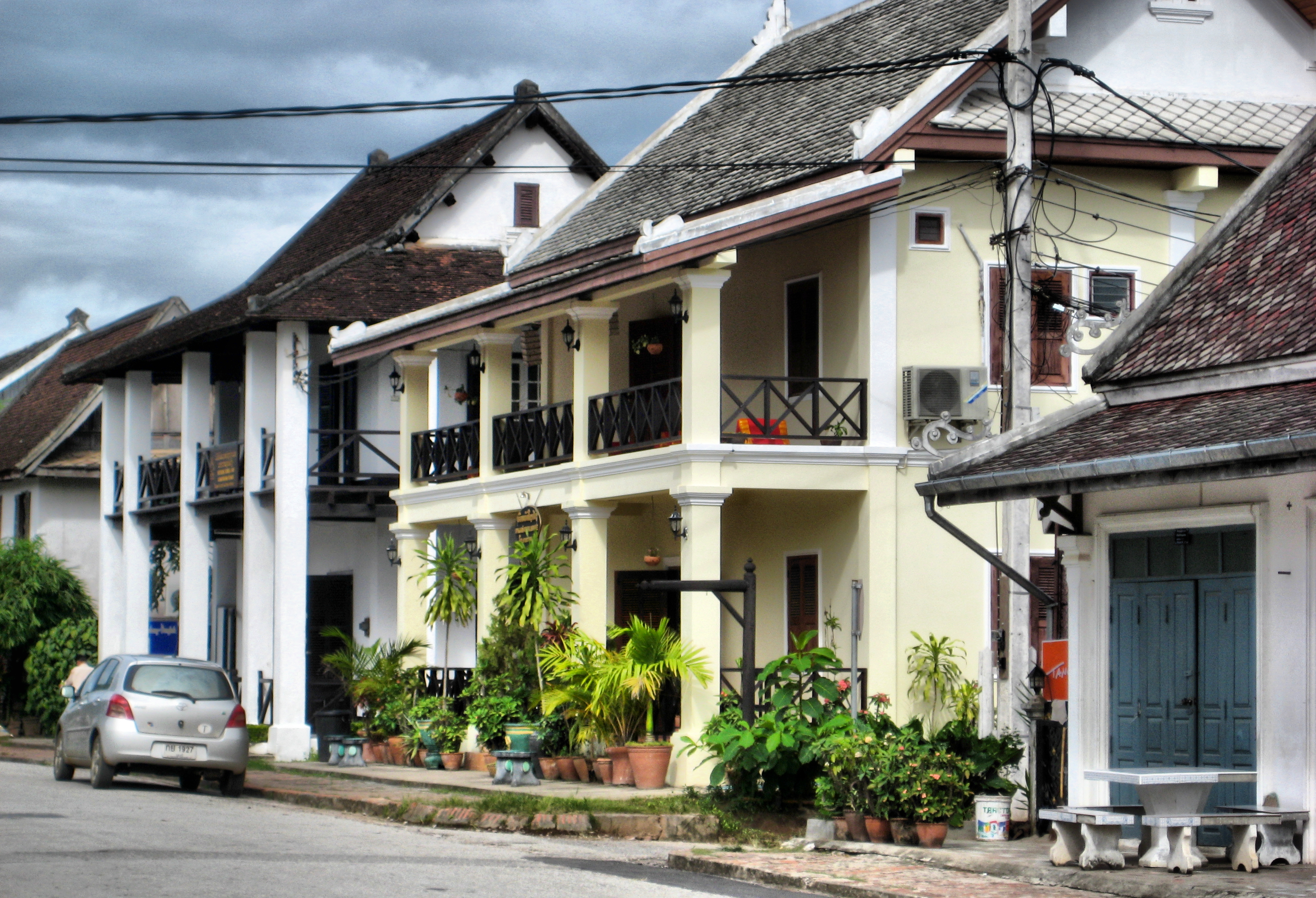
Guest houses in Laos

A guest house (or guesthouse, also rest house) is a kind of lodging. In some parts of the world (such as the Caribbean), a guest house is a type of inexpensive hotel-like lodging. In others, it is a private home that has been converted for the exclusive use of visitor accommodation. The owner usually lives in an entirely separate area within the property and the guest house may be used as a form of lodging business.

== Overview ==
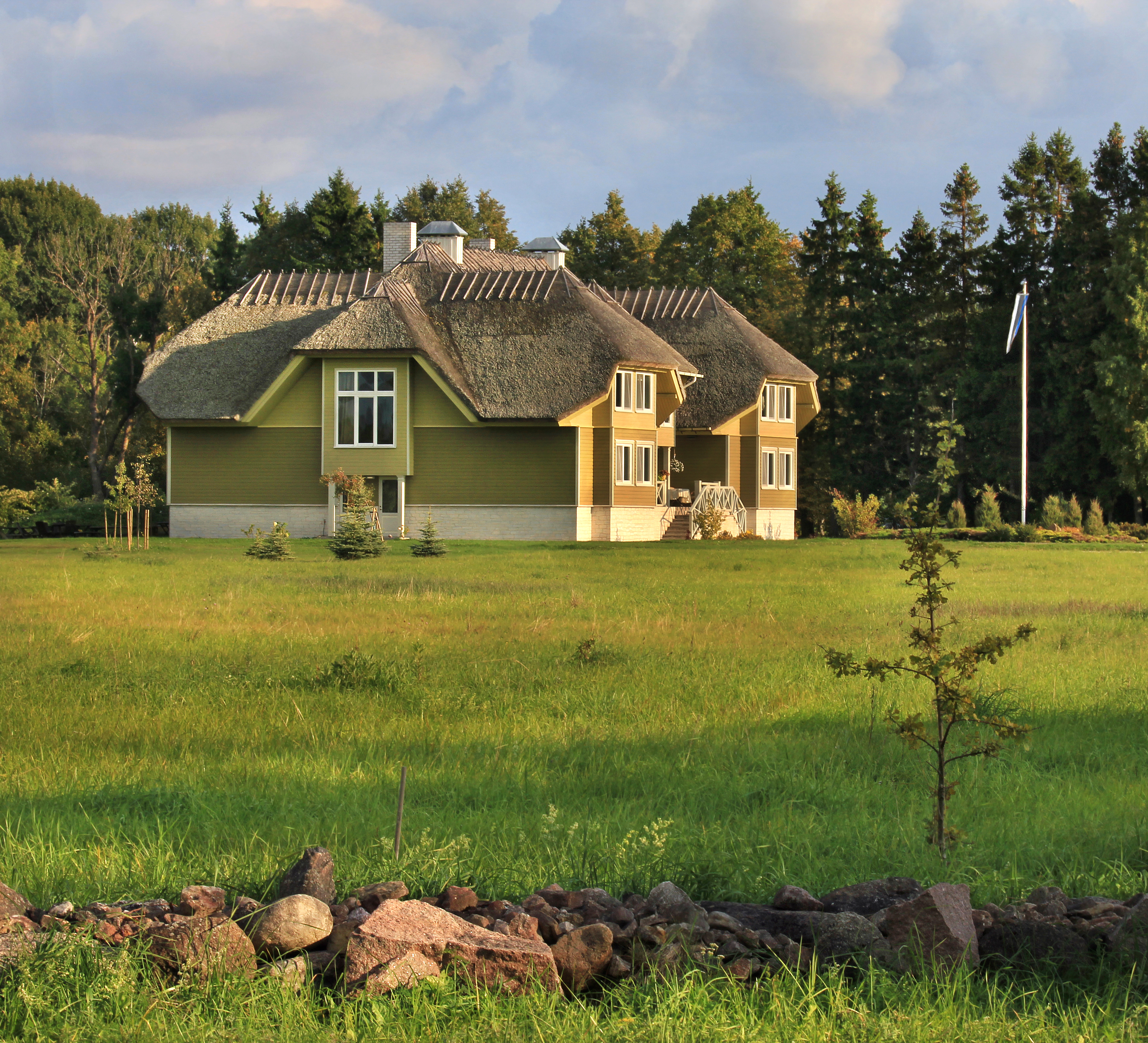
Guest House Altmõisa in Estonia. Tuuru village

In some areas of the world, guest houses are the only kind of accommodation available for visitors who have no local relatives with whom to stay. Among the features which distinguish a guest house from a hotel or inn is the lack of a full-time staff.

Under the 1956 Hotel Proprietor Act in the United Kingdom, while hotels have an obligation to accept travelers "in a fit state" if they have empty rooms, guest houses are allowed to be more selective.

Bed and breakfasts and guest houses in England are family-owned and the family lives on the premises, though family members are not normally available during the evening. However, most family members work a 10- to 12-hour day from 6 am as they may employ part-time service staff. Hotels maintain a staff presence 24 hours a day and 7 days a week, whereas a guest house has a more limited staff presence. Because of this, check-in at a guest house is often by appointment. An inn also usually has a restaurant attached.

In India, a tremendous growth can be seen in the guest house business especially in Delhi-NCR (national capital region) where progress in the IT sector and the Commonwealth Games 2010 were the two most influential factors. Nowadays the guest house accommodation sector has improved significantly, with even a home converted guest house also offering 3-star equivalent facilities to its guests.

In the United States, the term guest house may refer to rooms in private homes.

== Security ==
Generally, there are two variations of paying guest house:

1. Home converted guest house
2. Professionally run guest house with all necessary amenities and staff

In the first version of the guest house, the guests get to live with a family where they get shelter and food (bed and breakfast) only, and for the rest of the jobs like washing clothes and utensils, cleaning of room or area around their bed is to be done by the guests. In the second version, the guests receive some amenities necessary to live life comfortably like a fully furnished room, comfortable bed, air-conditioner, television, water supply and security.

A major advantage of a professionally run paying guest accommodation service is that the owner follows the safety norms set by the local government. Some of the important safety points include:

- Fire safety with regular fire drills
- Disaster management
- Updated safety equipment
- Information signboards for guests and staff
- Government certifications

== See also ==
- Dharamshala (type of building)
- Guest houses under the Islamic State
- Hotel
- Ryokan
- Secondary suite
