= Tanska =

Tanska may refer to:

- Tanska is a Finnish word for Denmark
- Tanska, Estonia, village in Haapsalu municipality, Lääne County, Estonia
- Jani Tanska (born 1988), Finnish football player
