= Liivaküla =

Liivaküla may refer to several places in Estonia:

- Liivaküla, Lääne-Nigula Parish, village in Lääne-Nigula Parish, Lääne County
- Liivaküla, Haapsalu, village in Haapsalu City, Lääne County
- Liivaküla, Lääne-Viru County, village in Väike-Maarja Parish, Lääne-Viru County
