= Sepaküla =

Sepaküla may refer to several places in Estonia:

- Sepaküla, Lääne County, village in Ridala Parish, Lääne County
- Sepaküla, Pärnu County, village in Halinga Parish, Pärnu County
