= Tammiku, Haapsalu =

Village in Estonia

Coordinates: 58°56′04″N 23°41′39″E

Tammiku
- Village
- Interactive map of Tammiku
- Country: Estonia
- County: Lääne County
- Municipality: Haapsalu
- Time zone: UTC+2 (EET)
  - Summer (DST): UTC+3 (EEST)

Tammiku is a village in Haapsalu municipality, Lääne County, in western Estonia. Prior to the 2017 administrative reform of local governments, it was located in Ridala Parish.

== Name ==
Tammiku appears in written records in the 17th century as Tammeck, referring to a meadow in the area. In the second half of the 19th century, it appears as a farm-name modifier in Tammiko Mihkel and Tammiko Peter, designating two farmers. The village was recorded as Таммико in 1913. The name (in the genitive case) comes from the common noun tammik 'oak forest', referring to the local vegetation.
