= Parila =

Parila may refer to several places in Estonia:

- Parila, Harju County, village in Anija Parish, Harju County
- Parila, Lääne County, village in Ridala Parish, Lääne County
- Parila, Saare County, village in Kaarma Parish, Saare County
