= Magari =

Magari may refer to:

- Magari language, a variety of Bhil spoken in India
- Magari, Estonia, a village in Kanepi Parish, Põlva County
- Mägari, a village in Haapsalu municipality, Lääne County, Estonia
- Magari (wine), a Tuscan wine by Gaja estate Ca'Marcanda
- Magari (film), a 2019 comedy-drama film
