= Ridala Parish =

Former municipality of Estonia

Coordinates: 58°56′35″N 23°38′42″E

Ridala Parish Ridala vald
- Former municipality of Estonia
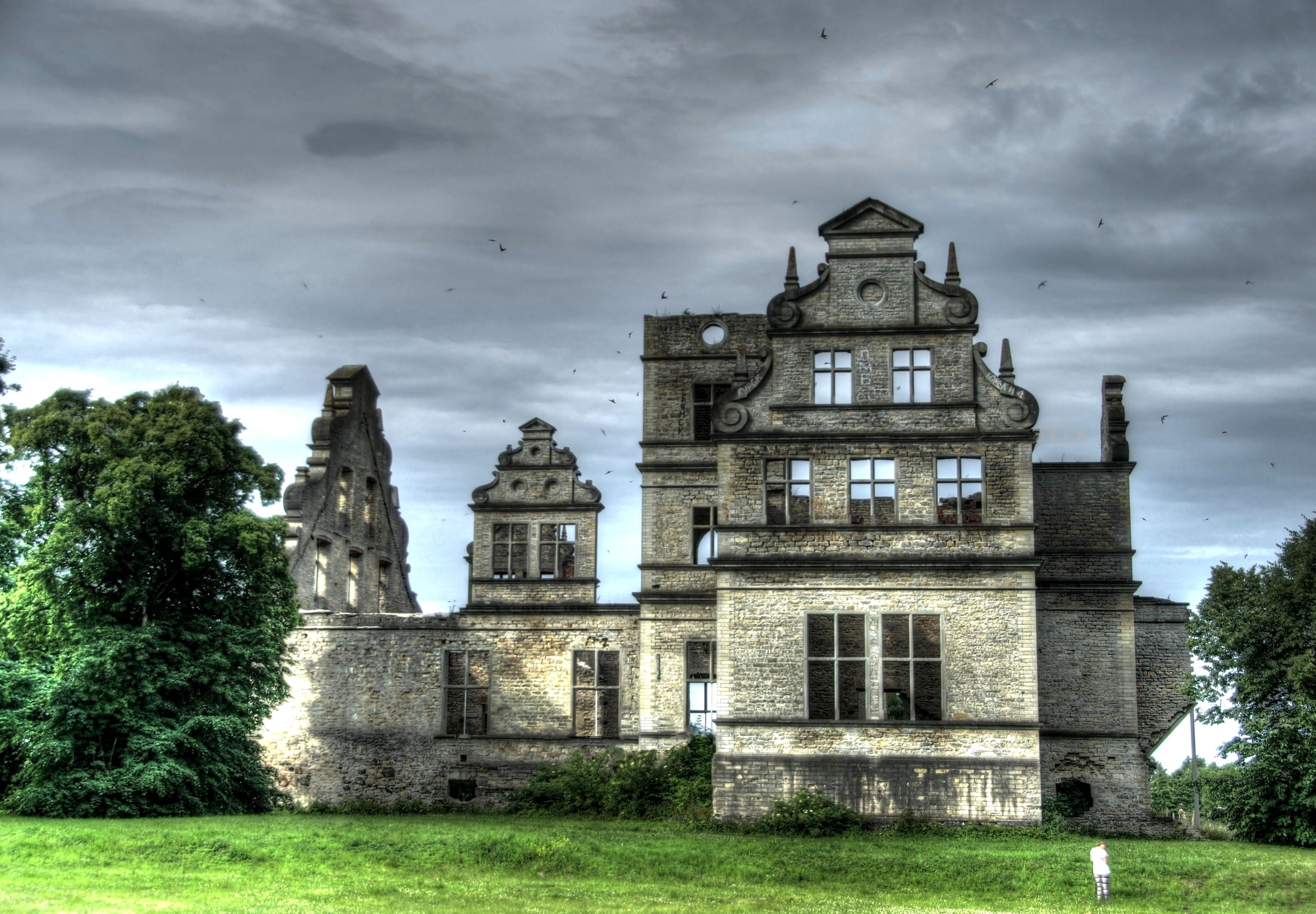
- Ungru Castle ruins

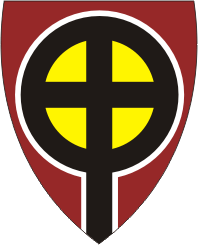
- Flag Coat of arms

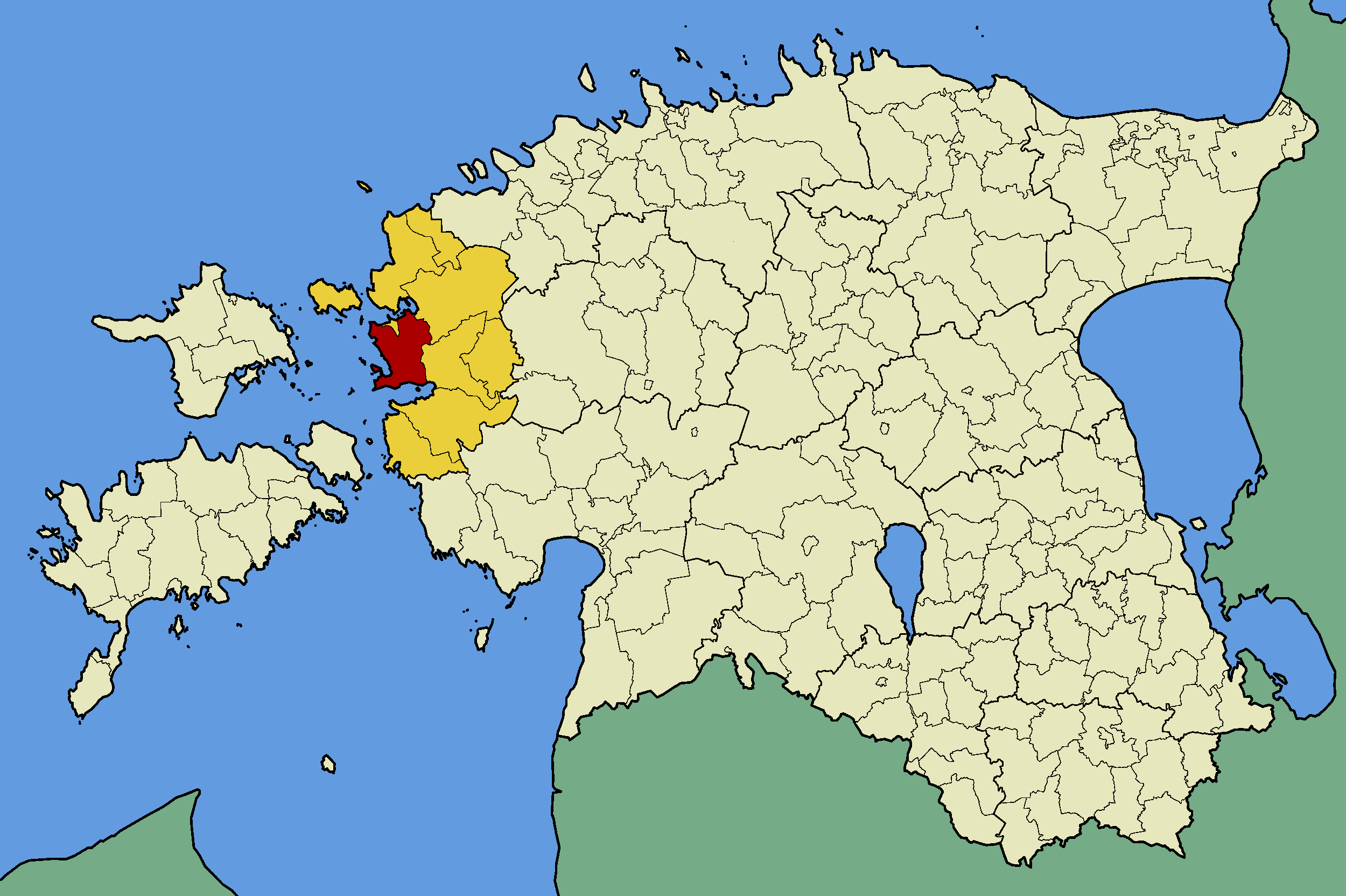
- Ridala Parish within Lääne County.
- Country: Estonia
- County: Lääne County
- Administrative centre: Uuemõisa

Area
  - Total: 253.4 km^{2} (97.8 sq mi)

Population (2016)
  - Total: 3,245
  - Density: 12.81/km^{2} (33.17/sq mi)
- Website: http://www.ridala.ee

Ridala (Estonian: Ridala vald) was a rural municipality of Estonia, in Lääne County. It had a population of 3,245 (2016) and an area of 253.4 km (157.5 mi).

In 2007 it was merged with the city of Haapsalu to establish the Haapsalu urban municipality.

Part of the parish is within the Matsalu National Park.

== Populated places ==
Ridala Parish had two small boroughs and 56 villages.

Small boroughs

Paralepa, Uuemõisa

Villages

Aamse, Allika, Ammuta, Emmuvere, Erja, Espre, Haeska, Herjava, Hobulaiu, Jõõdre, Kabrametsa, Kadaka, Kaevere, Kiideva, Kiltsi, Kiviküla, Koheri, Koidu, Kolila, Kolu, Käpla, Laheva, Lannuste, Liivaküla, Litu, Lõbe, Metsaküla, Mäeküla, Mägari, Nõmme, Panga, Parila, Puiatu, Puise, Pusku, Põgari-Sassi, Rohense, Rohuküla, Rummu, Saanika, Saardu, Sepaküla, Sinalepa, Suure-Ahli, Tammiku, Tanska, Tuuru, Uneste, Uuemõisa, Valgevälja, Varni, Vilkla, Võnnu, Väike-Ahli, Vätse, Üsse.

== See also ==
- Matsalu National Park
- Pullapää crisis
