= Kabrametsa =

Village in Estonia

Coordinates: 58°55′N 23°39′E

- Village
- Interactive map of Kabrametsa
- Country: Estonia
- County: Lääne County
- Municipality: Haapsalu
- Time zone: UTC+2 (EET)
  - Summer (DST): UTC+3 (EEST)

Kabrametsa is a village in Haapsalu municipality, Lääne County, in western Estonia.
