= Hobulaid =

Island in Estonia

Coordinates: 58°56′37″N 23°23′07″E

Hobulaid (German: Hestholm, Swedish: Hästholm) is a Baltic Sea island belonging to the country of Estonia.

Hobulaid is located between the island of Vormsi and the ferry port of Rohuküla on the Estonian mainland. Hobulaid has an area of 75 hectares. The highest point is 6.6 metres above sea level.

The island was first mentioned in chronicles in 1391 and had a history of Swedish colonization. In the Middle Ages Hobulaid belonged to the Bishopric of Ösel-Wiek of Haapsalu. Today, the island is an important breeding ground for numerous bird species.

On the southern tip of Hobulaid is a 13-meter-high functioning lighthouse. The structure is operated by the Estonian Maritime Administration and dates from 1934.

Near Hobulaid are the small islands Obholmsgrunne (Swedish: Upholm), Odrarahu and Varsarahu.

== Gallery ==
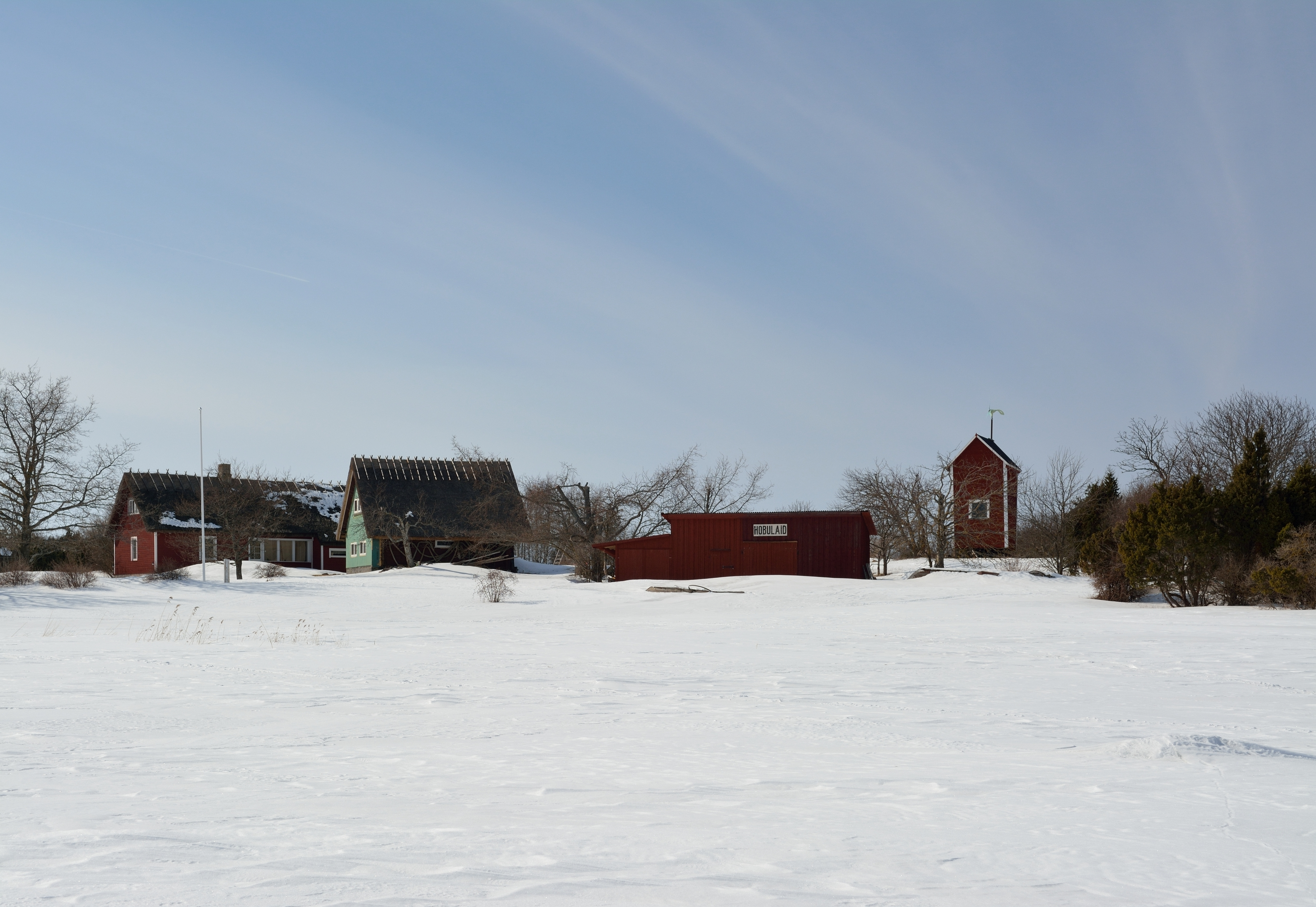
Hobulaid

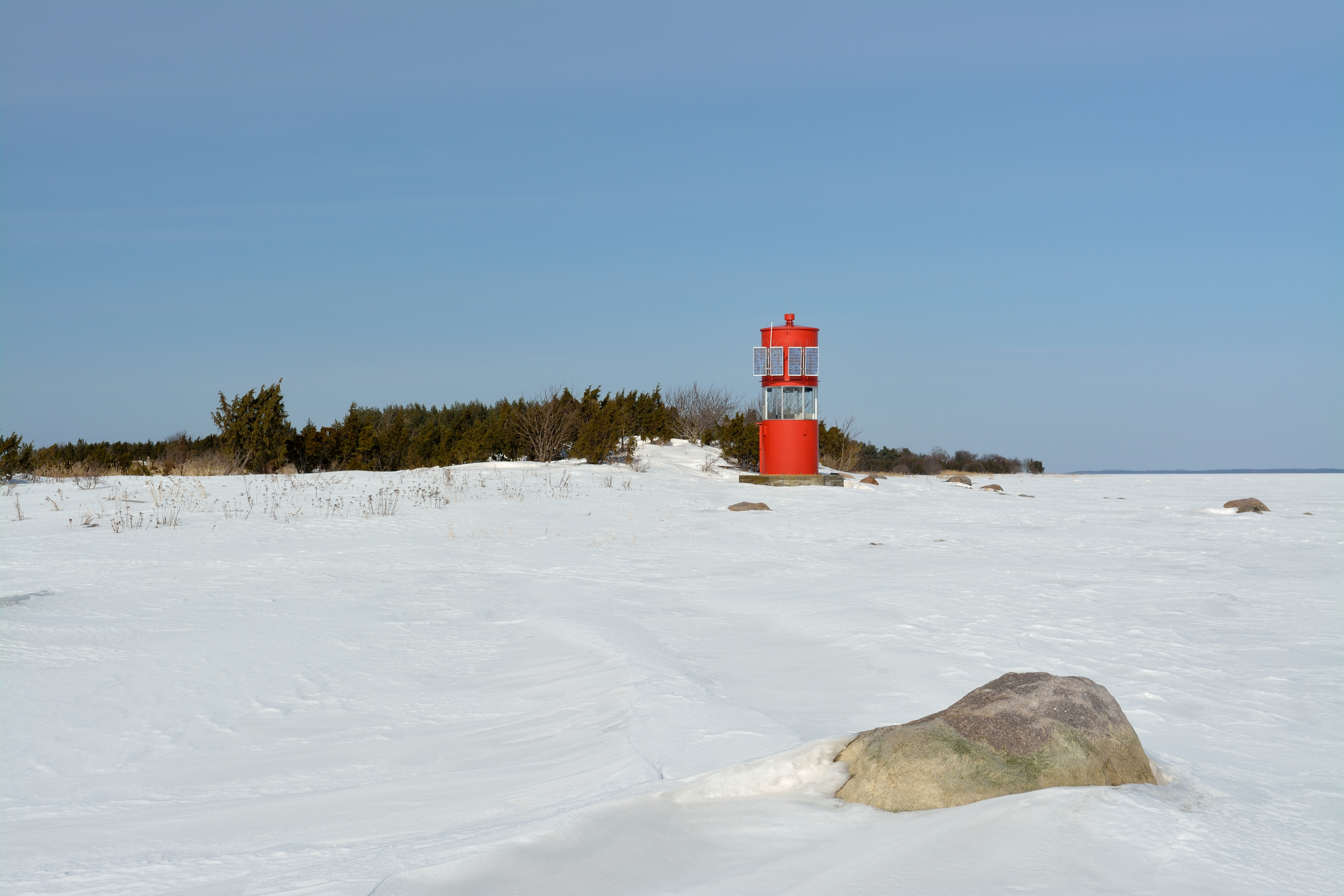
Southern lightbeacon

== See also ==
- List of islands of Estonia
