= 2017 Estonian administrative reforms =

Municipalities in Estonia before (left) and after (right) the reform in 2017
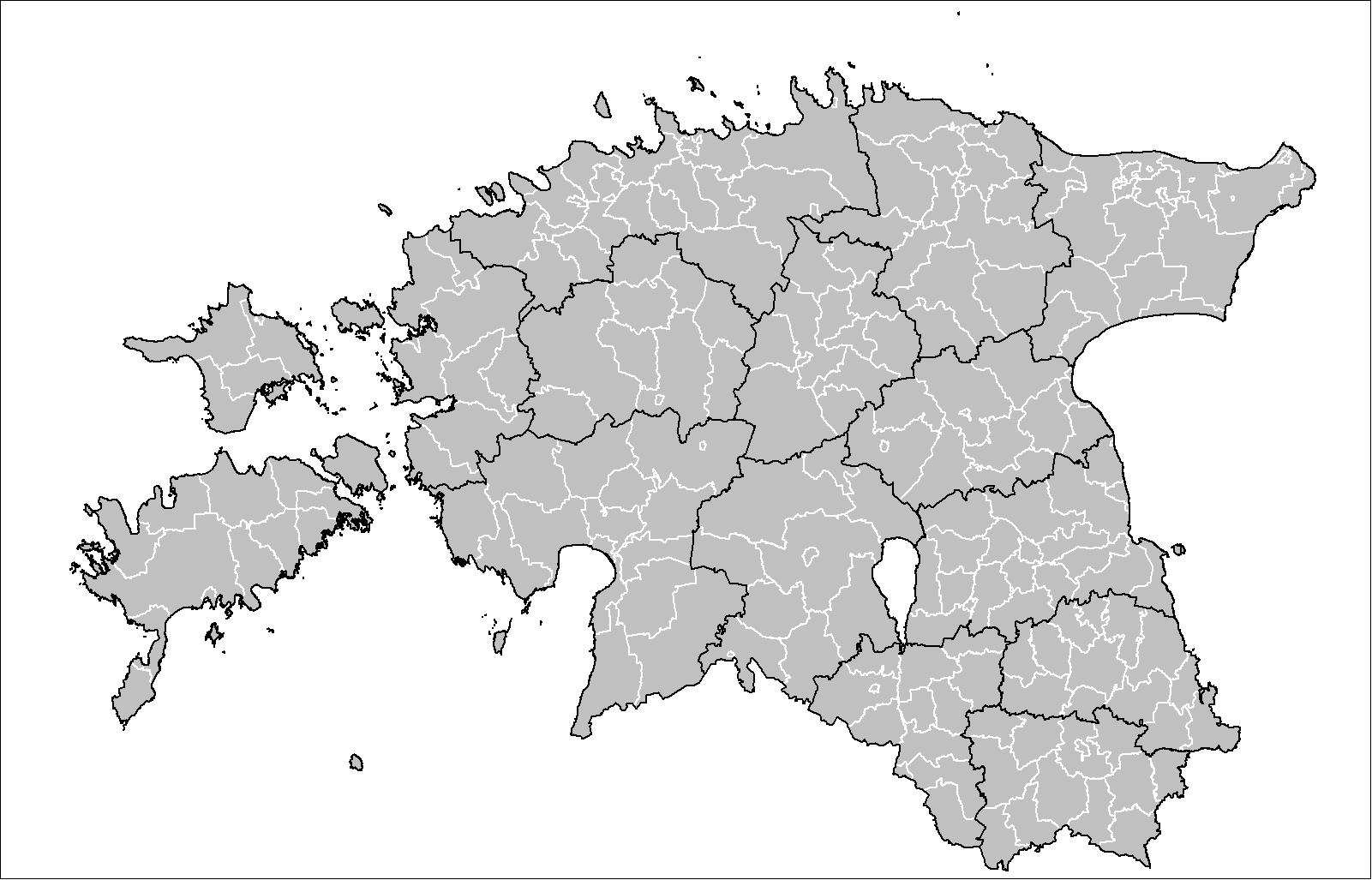
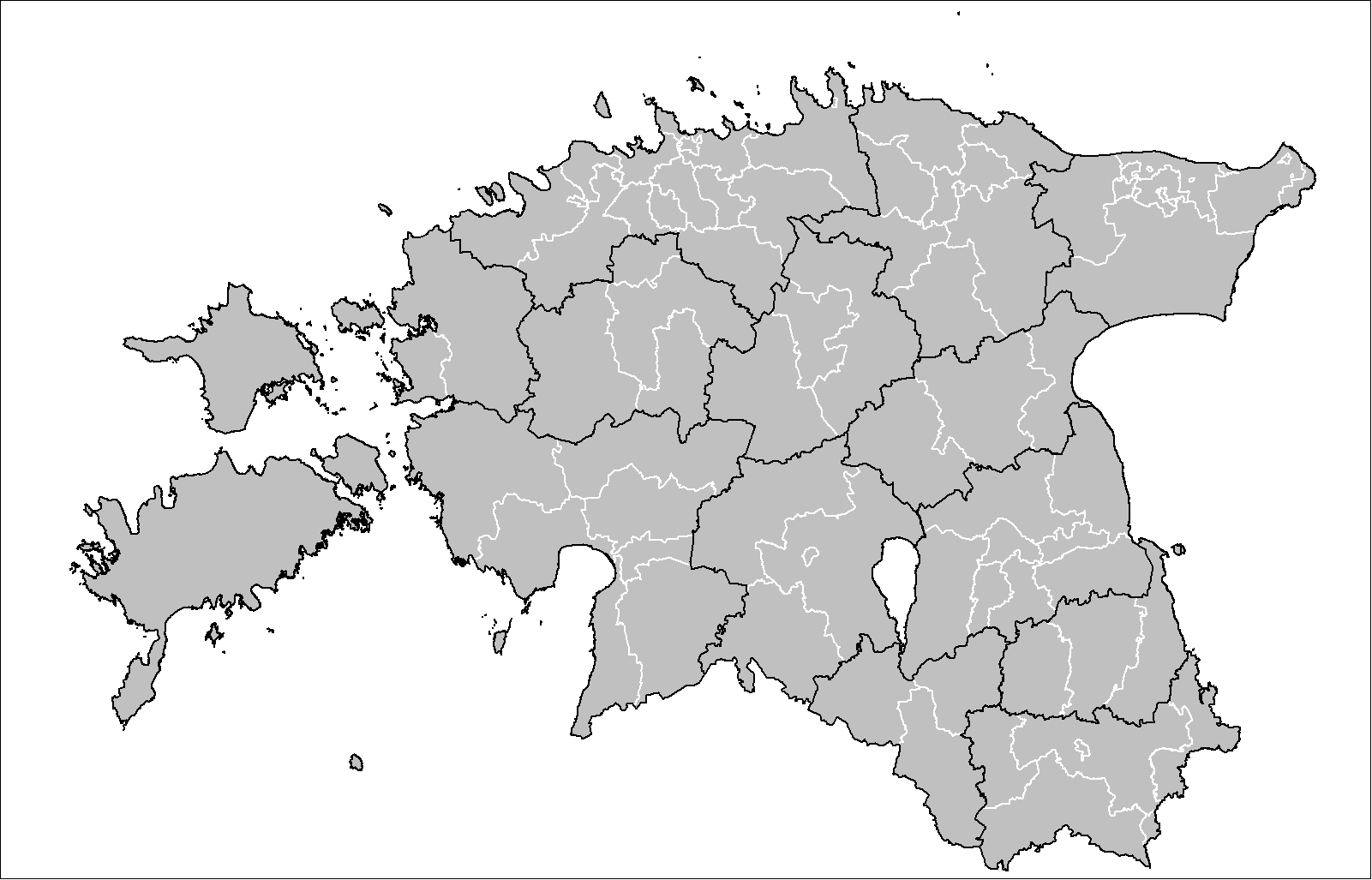

The 2017 Estonian administrative reform (Estonian: Eesti omavalitsuste haldusreform) was a territorial administrative reform resulting in new administrative units in Estonia. In general, old units incorporated voluntarily, but in some cases incorporations were forced by state powers. As a result, Estonia now has 79 administrative units, down from 213: 15 urban and 64 rural municipalities. 185 municipalities merged to form 51 new ones, and 28 municipalities did not merge.

In the course of the administrative reform, the names of many villages were changed (most of them in Saare County and Võru County) due to the same municipality being unable to have several villages with the same name. In total, 50 villages had their names changed and 9 villages merged with another village.

Due to political considerations and strong opposition from municipalities, the reform could not be carried out in this form earlier. However, since 2004, the state had been offering merger support to municipalities. As a result of that, several municipalities had therefore already previously merged on their own initiative. For example, from 1997 to 2008, 47 local governments merged into twenty local government units. A more active accession started in 2015 and the administrative reform was completed in 2017.

== Goals ==
The manifesto of the second Taavi Rõivas cabinet which took office in April 2015 mentioned the government's intention to carry out an administrative reform. With the administrative reform bill approved by the government in March 2016, the government set a criterion according to which the lower limit of the population of municipalities had to be 5,000 inhabitants when adopting the law although aiming to reach municipalities with at least 11,000 inhabitants.

The goal of the administrative reform, which was written into the administrative reform law, was the increase in the capacity of local governments, as their capacity was different in terms of their financial potential, the number of officials and the provision of services. The broader goal of the 2017 administrative reform was to develop and change local governments in a way that would enable them to provide better services to residents, be regionally competitive among local governments, and perform statutory duties independently. The aforementioned included the increase in the management of local government units and the greater ability of the local government to direct the development of its region. The focus of the administrative reform was mainly on the transformation of local governments, but county governments were to also benefit from the reform.

The desired results of the reform were to achieve an increase in the role of municipal governments in the organization of social life, the growth of municipal governments' competence, the strengthening of local representative and participatory democracy and the integrity and logic of the territoriality of self-governing units.

== Adoption and implementation ==
On June 7, 2016, the Riigikogu adopted the Law on Administrative Reform. 56 MPs voted in favor of the law with 38 against.

The Administrative Reform Act and the unconstitutionality of its individual sections were contested in the Supreme Court by several municipal governments with the controversial part being the forced operation of the administrative reform which the municipal governments argued violated the autonomy of the local governments and constitutional guarantees. The court came to the conclusion that administrative organization is not a matter for local governments but rather a matter for the state so the state was to have broad competence to decide what the administrative organization should be in the country with local governments having the right to be heard but not refuse to join another entity should the state decide so.

On 15 February 2017, the national government made merger proposals to local governments that had not merged on their own initiative. If the local government unit did not submit an opinion on the merger proposal by 15 May 2017, the proposal was considered accepted. If the local government unit objected to the proposal, the national government could, based on the reasons given in the opinion of the local government unit, terminate the procedure for changing the administrative territorial organization or decide to change the administrative territorial organization of the local government units with its own regulation, if the reasons given in the opinion were not sufficient in the opinion of the national government. Compulsory mergers were initiated for those local government units that had less than 5,000 inhabitants as of 1 January 2017 and to which exceptions could not be applied.

The tasks of the local government unit that received the proposal were as follows:

- find out the residents' opinion about the change in the administrative territorial organization
- to submit a reasoned opinion in the form of a decision to the county governor on the proposal of the national government by 15 May 2017 at the latest
- to carry out the election procedures stipulated in the Local Government Council Election Act in cooperation with the relevant councils by 15 June 2017 at the latest
- to agree with the other relevant councils by 15 June 2017 at the latest on the resolution of possible organizational, budgetary and other property obligations and rights related to the change of the name of the municipality, the type and symbols of the administrative unit, the administrative territorial organization or the boundaries, and the preparation of the necessary changes to the statutes of the new municipality and other legislation.

The national government had the obligation to take into account the possible impact on the living conditions of the residents, the quality of public services, administrative capacity, the demographic situation, the organization of transport and communication, the business environment, the state of education and the functioning of the municipality as a single service area. It was also necessary to take into account the historical justification and the sense of belonging of the inhabitants. In the case of local government units that do not meet the minimum size, i.e. less than 5,000 inhabitants, the national government may apply an exception and not require forced merger, should this not have a negative impact on the aforementioned circumstances and one of the following conditions is met in the case of the local government unit:

- merger of at least two local government units forming a logical whole, with a total area of at least 900 km^{2} and a population of at least 3,500 as of 1 January 2017
- formation of a local government unit from the territories of at least four historically, culturally and geographically related local government units or their parts, with a population of at least 3,500 as of 1 January 2017
- the municipality is a maritime archipelago including the territory of the island as a whole where independent self-governing management is carried out
- the population of the municipality was more than 5,000 as of 1 January 2016 but due to the decrease in the number of inhabitants, it no longer meets this criterion as of 1 January 2017.

== Old and new administrative units ==
Administrative reform in Estonia
| Old units | Population (as of 1 December 2016) | Area (km^{2}) | New units |
|---|---|---|---|
| Saue Parish, Saue, Kernu Parish, Nissi Parish | 21 456 | 639 | Saue Parish |
| Aegviidu Parish, Anija Parish | 6348 | 533 | Anija Parish |
| Käina Parish, Hiiu Parish | 6726 | 571 | Hiiumaa Parish |
| Toila Parish, Kohtla Parish, Kohtla-Nõmme Parish | 4850 | 267 | Toila Parish |
| Vaivara Parish, Narva-Jõesuu | 4543 | 409 | Narva-Jõesuu |
| Saare Parish, Avinurme Parish, Lohusuu Parish, Kasepää Parish, Mustvee* | 5653 | 568 | Mustvee Parish |
| Põltsamaa, Põltsamaa Parish, Pajusi Parish, Puurmani Parish | 10 611 | 949 | Põltsamaa Parish |
| Jõgeva Parish, Jõgeva, Palamuse Parish, Torma Parish | 13 810 | 1028 | Jõgeva Parish |
| Paide, Paide Parish, Roosna-Alliku Parish | 10 863 | 442 | Paide |
| Järva-Jaani Parish, Albu Parish, Ambla Parish, Imavere Parish, Kareda Parish, Koigi Parish, Koeru Parish | 7192 | 986 | Järva Parish |
| Türi Parish, Väätsa Parish, Käru Parish | 11 198 | 1009 | Türi Parish |
| Ridala Parish, Haapsalu | 13 617 | 264 | Haapsalu |
| Lääne-Nigula Parish, Noarootsi Parish, Nõva Parish, Martna Parish, Kullamaa Parish | 7264 | 1439 | Lääne-Nigula Parish |
| Lihula Parish, Hanila Parish, Varbla Parish, Koonga Parish | 5613 | 1352 | Lääneranna Parish |
| Haljala Parish, Vihula Parish | 4402 | 547 | Haljala Parish |
| Rägavere Parish, Vinni Parish, Laekvere Parish | 7069 | 1013 | Vinni Parish |
| Tamsalu Parish, Tapa Parish | 11 405 | 479 | Tapa Parish |
| Kunda, Estonia, Viru-Nigula Parish, Aseri Parish | 6059 | 311 | Viru-Nigula Parish |
| Sõmeru Parish, Rakvere Parish | 5603 | 296 | Rakvere Parish |
| Kuressaare, Lääne-Saare Parish, Orissaare Parish, Pihtla Parish, Valjala Parish, Salme Parish, Kihelkonna Parish, Laimjala Parish, Mustjala Parish, Torgu Parish, Leisi Parish, Pöide Parish | 32 007 | 2705 | Saaremaa Parish |
| Elva, Konguta Parish, Rannu Parish, Rõngu Parish, Palupera Parish, Puhja Parish | 14 241 | 650 | Elva Parish |
| Helme Parish, Hummuli Parish, Põdrala Parish, Tõrva | 6386 | 607 | Tõrva Parish |
| Valga, Karula Parish, Taheva Parish, Tõlliste Parish, Õru Parish | 16 773 | 794 | Valga Parish |
| Viljandi Parish, Kolga-Jaani Parish, Tarvastu Parish | 14 036 | 1374 | Viljandi Parish |
| Vändra, Vändra Parish, Tootsi Parish, Halinga Parish | 8596 | 1012 | Põhja-Pärnumaa Parish |
| Pärnu, Audru Parish, Paikuse Parish | 50 445 | 594 | Pärnu |
| Sauga Parish, Tori Parish, Sindi, Are Parish | 11 701 | 612 | Tori Parish |
| Rapla Parish, Kaiu Parish, Raikküla Parish | 12 061 | 728 | Rapla Parish |
| Kehtna Parish, Järvakandi Parish | 5666 | 512 | Kehtna Parish |
| Märjamaa Parish, Vigala Parish | 7805 | 1142 | Märjamaa Parish |
| Kõlleste Parish, Kanepi Parish, Valgjärve Parish | 4891 | 526 | Kanepi Parish |
| Põlva Parish, Ahja Parish, Laheda Parish, Mooste Parish, Vastse-Kuuste Parish | 14 452 | 707 | Põlva Parish |
| Räpina Parish, Veriora Parish, Meeksi Parish | 6661 | 609 | Räpina Parish |
| Piirissaare Parish, Tartu Parish, Laeva Parish, Tabivere Parish | 8159 | 541 | Tartu Parish |
| Mäksa Parish, Võnnu Parish, Haaslava Parish | 4855 | 476 | Kastre Parish |
| Pala Parish, Vara Parish, Alatskivi Parish, Peipsiääre Parish, Kallaste | | 652 | Peipsiääre Parish |
| Sangaste Parish, Otepää Parish, Palupera Parish (Lutike, Makita, Miti, Neeruti, Nõuni, Päidla and Räbi villages) | 5705 | 443 | Otepää Parish |
| Karksi Parish, Abja Parish, Halliste Parish, Mõisaküla | 7793 | 881 | Mulgi Parish |
| Suure-Jaani Parish, Võhma, Kõo Parish, Kõpu Parish | 8324 | 1153 | Põhja-Sakala Parish |
| Lasva Parish, Orava Parish, Sõmerpalu Parish, Võru Parish, Vastseliina Parish | 8295 | 555 | Võru Parish |
| Antsla Parish, Urvaste Parish | 4651 | 411 | Antsla Parish |
| Mõniste Parish, Misso Parish, Varstu Parish, Haanja Parish, Rõuge Parish | 5815 | 971 | Rõuge Parish |
| Iisaku Parish, Alajõe Parish, Mäetaguse Parish, Tudulinna Parish, Illuka Parish | 3974 | 921 | Alutaguse Parish |
| Tartu, Tähtvere Parish | | | Tartu |
| Väike-Maarja Parish, Rakke Parish | | | Väike-Maarja Parish |

*Plus Võtikvere village from Torma Parish.
