= Haapsalu (urban municipality) =

Municipality of Estonia

Haapsalu Estonian: Haapsalu linn
- Municipality of Estonia
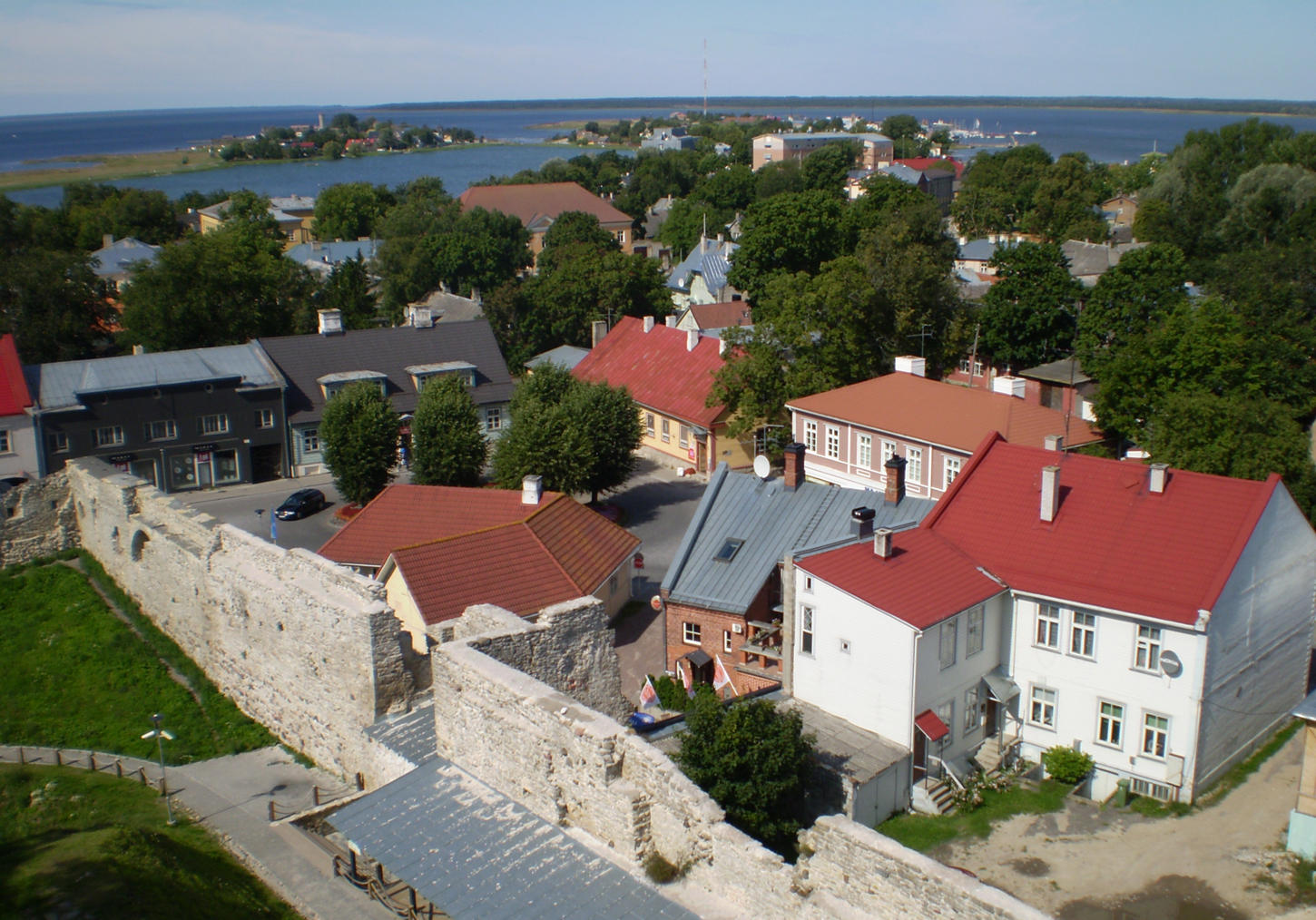

- Flag Coat of arms

- Location of Haapsalu in Estonia
- Country: Estonia
- County: Lääne County
- Administrative centre: Haapsalu

Government
  - Mayor: Urmas Sukles (Reform Party)

Area
  - Total: 272 km^{2} (105 sq mi)

Population (2026)
  - Total: 13,033
  - Density: 47.9/km^{2} (124/sq mi)
- ISO 3166 code: EE-184
- Website: Official website

Haapsalu (Estonian: Haapsalu linn) is an urban municipality of Estonia, in Lääne County. It comprises the town of Haapsalu and settlements of the former parish of Ridala.

== Demographics ==
As of 1 January 2026, the municipality had 13,033 residents, of which 7,106 (54.5%) were women and 5,927 (45.5%) were men.

=== Religion ===
Among residents of the parish above 15 years of age, 11.0 per cent declared themselves to be Lutheran, 10.3 per cent to be Orthodox, 2.6 per cent to be Baptist, while other Christian denominations made up 2.2 per cent of the population. The majority of residents of the parish, 72.1 per cent, were religiously unaffiliated. 1.3 per cent of the population followed other religions or did not specify their religious affiliation.

== International relations ==
=== Twin towns – Sister cities ===
Haapsalu is twinned with:

- Bethlehem, Palestine (2010)
- Eskilstuna, Sweden (2005)
- Fundão, Portugal (2004)
- Greve in Chianti, Italy (2004)
- Haninge, Sweden (1998)
- Hanko, Finland (1992)
- Loviisa, Finland (2000)
- Rendsburg, Germany (1989)
- Uman, Ukraine (2003)
