= Rooba =

Family name

Rooba is an Estonian surname which may refer to:

- Meelis Rooba (born 1977), Estonian footballer
- Robert Rooba (born 1993), Estonian ice hockey player
- Urmas Rooba (born 1978), Estonian footballer
