= Nurmsi =

Nurmsi may refer to several places in Estonia:

- Nurmsi, Järva County, village in Paide Parish, Järva County
  - Nurmsi Airfield, in Nurmsi, Paide Parish
- Nurmsi, Lääne County, village in Hanila Parish, Lääne County
