= Kaaruka =

Village in Estonia

- Village
- Location in Estonia
- Coordinates: 59°00′48″N 25°44′13″E
- Country: Estonia
- County: Järva County
- Municipality: Paide
- First mentioned: 1564

Population (31.12.2010)
  - Total: 78

Kaaruka is a village in Paide municipality, Järva County in northern-central Estonia. Prior to the 2017 administrative reform in Estonia of local governments, it was located in Roosna-Alliku Parish. The village is located just southeast of Roosna-Alliku, the former administrative centre of the Roosna-Alliku Parish. It has a population of 78 (as of 31 December 2010).

Kaaruka was first mentioned in 1564.

Football players Meelis Rooba and Urmas Rooba were born in Kaaruka.

Writer Wimberg described Kaaruka as the main location of his 2002 novel "Lipamäe".
