= Valgma =

Valgma may refer to several places in Estonia:

- Valgma, Järva County, village in Paide Parish, Järva County
- Valgma, Tartu County, village in Tartu Parish, Tartu County
