= Ojaküla =

Ojaküla may refer to several places in Estonia:

- Ojaküla, Hiiu County, village in Hiiumaa Parish, Hiiu County
- Ojaküla, Järva County, village in Paide, Järva County
- Ojaküla, Lääne-Viru County, village in Viru-Nigula Parish, Lääne-Viru County
