= Esna, Paide =

Village in Estonia

Coordinates: 58°58′55″N 25°47′40″E

Esna
- Village
- Interactive map of Esna
- Country: Estonia
- County: Järva County
- Municipality: Paide
- Time zone: UTC+2 (EET)
  - Summer (DST): UTC+3 (EEST)

Esna (German: Orrisaar) is a village in Paide municipality, Järva County in northern-central Estonia. Prior to the 2017 administrative reform of local governments, it was located in Roosna-Alliku Parish.

== Name ==
Esna was attested in historical sources as Hörisell in the 14th century, Orgesell in 1615, and Esna in 1732. The name Esna is derived from the nobleman Alexander von Essen (1595–1694), who built a manor at the site in 1623. The German name of the village, Orrisaar, preserves its original name, which was either Orisalu or Orissaare in the first half of the 18th century. The older name may be a compound of ori 'large tree' + salu 'grove surrounded by open land' or saar 'grove' (thus 'grove of large trees'), or ori 'large tree' + selg 'ridge, chain of hills' (the Grünewaldt family cemetery is located on a long ridge north of the village).

== Notable people ==
- Ekaterina Kalinina, Estonian Old Bolshevik and spouse of the Soviet head of state Mikhail Kalinin
