= Richard Indreko =

Estonian historian and archaeologist

- Born: 25 February [O.S. 13 February] 1900; Puiatu, Purdi parish, Järvamaa
- Died: 10 March 1961; Stockholm
- Education: University of Tartu
- Occupations: Historian and archaeologist

Richard Indreko (25 February [O.S. 13 February] 1900 in Puiatu, Purdi parish, Järvamaa – 10 March 1961 in Stockholm) was an Estonian historian and archaeologist. He is noted for his research into ancient Estonian history.

From 1923-1927 he studied at the University of Tartu and became a lecturer there in 1933. From 1933 to 1937 he led the excavations in Lammasmägi near Kunda (Kunda culture) and in Asva, Saaremaa. He conducted important research into the Origin and Area of Settlement of the Finno-Ugrian peoples.

In 1941 he published "Mid Stone Age in Estonia" ("Keskmine kiviaeg Eestis"). In 1943 he fled to Finland and settled a year later in Sweden. He died in Stockholm in 1961. Shortly afterwards his Prehistoric Age of Estonia was published in 1962.
