= Paide (urban municipality) =

Municipality of Estonia (2017)

Paide Estonian: Paide linn
- Municipality of Estonia
- Flag Coat of arms

- Country: Estonia
- County: Järva County
- Administrative centre: Paide

Government
  - Mayor: Priit Värk (ISAMAA)

Area
  - Total: 443 km^{2} (171 sq mi)

Population (2022)
  - Total: 10,438
  - Density: 23.6/km^{2} (61.0/sq mi)
- ISO 3166 code: EE-567
- Website: Official website

Paide (Estonian: Paide linn) is an urban municipality of Estonia, in Järva County. It comprises the town of Paide and settlements of former parishes of Paide and Roosna-Alliku.

== Settlements ==
Towns

- Paide

Boroughs

- Roosna-Alliku

Villages

- Allikjärve - Anna - Eivere - Esna - Kaaruka - Kihme - Kirila - Kirisaare - Kodasema - Koordi - Korba - Kriilevälja - Mustla - Mustla-Nõmme - Mäeküla - Mäo - Mündi - Nurme - Nurmsi - Oeti - Ojaküla - Otiku - Pikaküla - Prääma - Puiatu - Purdi - Sargvere - Seinapalu - Sillaotsa - Suurpalu - Sõmeru - Tarbja - Tännapere - Valasti - Valgma - Vedruka - Veskiaru - Viisu - Viraksaare - Võõbu

== Twin towns – sister cities ==
Paide is twinned with:

- Annaberg-Buchholz, Germany
- Fredensborg, Denmark
- Håbo, Sweden
- Hamina, Finland
- Havířov, Czech Republic
- Jämijärvi, Finland
- Mažeikiai, Lithuania
- Pereiaslav, Ukraine
- Saldus, Latvia
- Westminster, United States
