= Sargvere =

Village in Estonia

Coordinates: 58°53′N 25°43′E

- Village
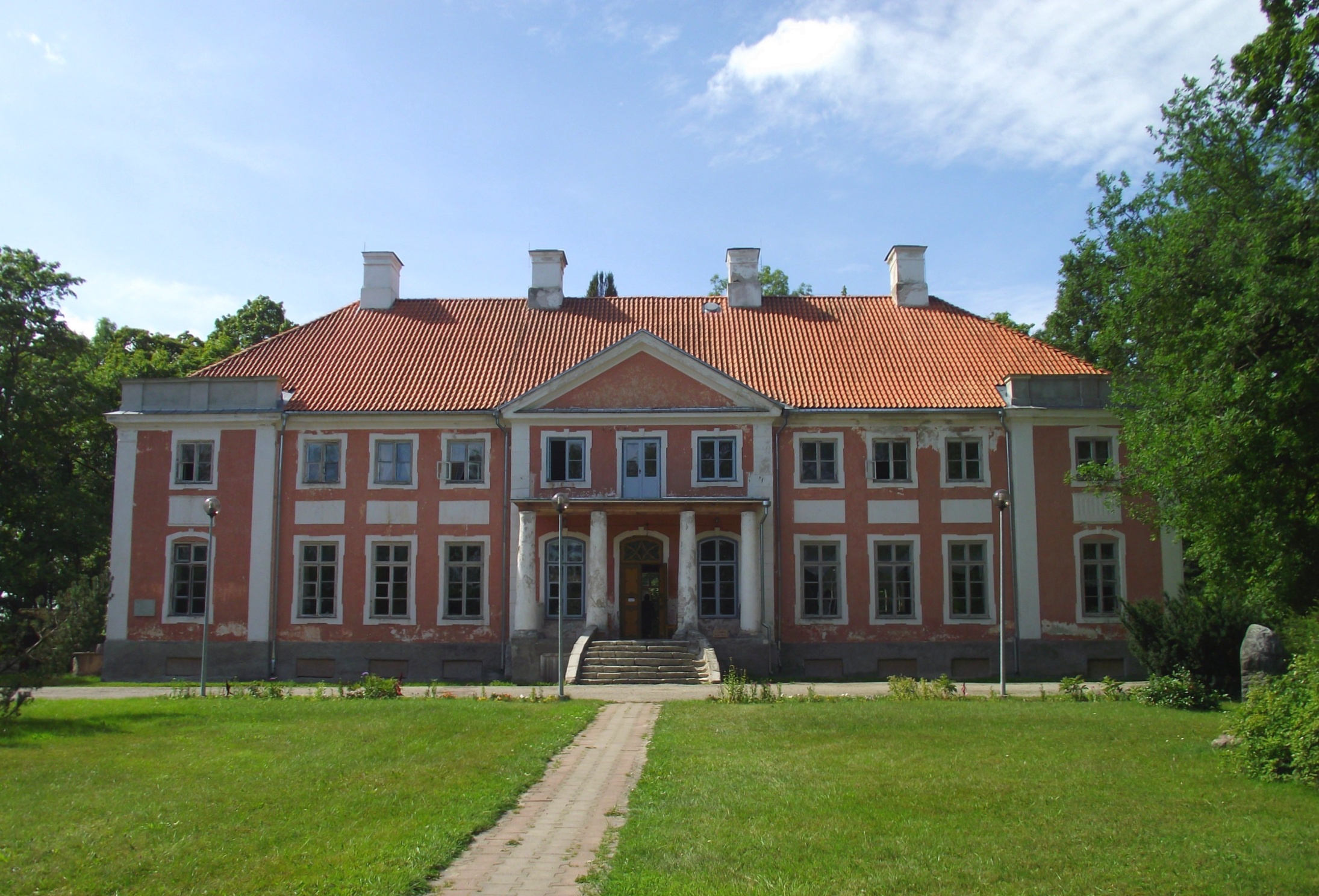
- Sargvere manor
- Interactive map of Sargvere
- Country: Estonia
- County: Järva County
- Municipality: Paide
- Time zone: UTC+2 (EET)
  - Summer (DST): UTC+3 (EEST)

Sargvere (German: Sarkfer) is a village in Paide municipality, Järva County in northern-central Estonia. Prior to the 2017 administrative reform of local governments, it was located in Paide Parish.

Nurmsi Airfield (ICAO: EENI) is partially located on the territory of Sargvere.
