= Korba =

Korba may refer to:

== Places ==
- Korba, Chhattisgarh, a city in India
  - Korba district, an administrative district in India
  - Korba railway station
  - Korba (Lok Sabha constituency)
  - Korba (Vidhan Sabha constituency)
- Korba, Heliopolis, Cairo, Egypt
- Korba, Estonia, Paide Parish, Järva County
- Korba, Tunisia

== Other uses ==
- CS Korba, a football club based in Korba, Tunisia
- Józef Korbas (1914–1981), Polish footballer
- Korba (Dune), a character in the novel Dune Messiah by Frank Herbert

== See also ==
- Common Object Request Broker Architecture (CORBA)
