= Mustla (disambiguation) =

Mustla may refer to several places in Estonia:

- Mustla, small borough in Viljandi Parish, Viljandi County
- Mustla, Järva County, village in Paide, Järva County
- Mustla, Pärnu County, village in Saarde Parish, Pärnu County
- Mustla, Saaremaa Parish, village in Saaremaa Parish, Saare County
- Saue-Mustla, village in Saaremaa Parish, Saare County, known as Mustla until 2017 when located in Pihtla Parish
