= Vedruka, Järva County =

Village in Estonia

Coordinates: 58°58′39″N 25°42′39″E

Vedruka
- Village
- Interactive map of Vedruka
- Country: Estonia
- County: Järva County
- Municipality: Paide
- Time zone: UTC+2 (EET)
  - Summer (DST): UTC+3 (EEST)

Vedruka is a village in Paide municipality, Järva County, in northern-central Estonia. Prior to the 2017 administrative reform in Estonia of local governments, it was located in Roosna-Alliku Parish.
