= Mäeküla, Paide =

Village in Estonia

Coordinates: 58°52′50″N 25°41′25″E

Mäeküla
- Village
- Interactive map of Mäeküla
- Country: Estonia
- County: Järva County
- Municipality: Paide
- Time zone: UTC+2 (EET)
  - Summer (DST): UTC+3 (EEST)

Mäeküla is a village in Paide municipality, Järva County in northern-central Estonia. Prior to the 2017 administrative reform of local governments, it was located in Paide Parish.
