= Mustla-Nõmme =

Village in Estonia

Coordinates: 59°05′N 25°25′E

- Village
- Interactive map of Mustla-Nõmme
- Country: Estonia
- County: Järva County
- Municipality: Paide
- Time zone: UTC+2 (EET)
  - Summer (DST): UTC+3 (EEST)

Mustla-Nõmme is a village in Paide municipality, Järva County in northern-central Estonia. Prior to the 2017 administrative reform of local governments, it was located in Paide Parish.
