= Paide Parish =

Former municipality of Estonia

Coordinates: 58°53′N 25°34′E

Paide Parish Paide vald
- Former municipality of Estonia
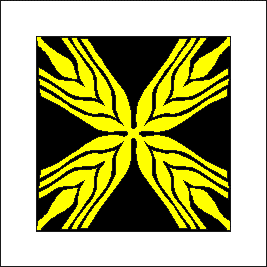
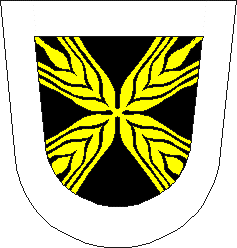
- Flag Coat of arms

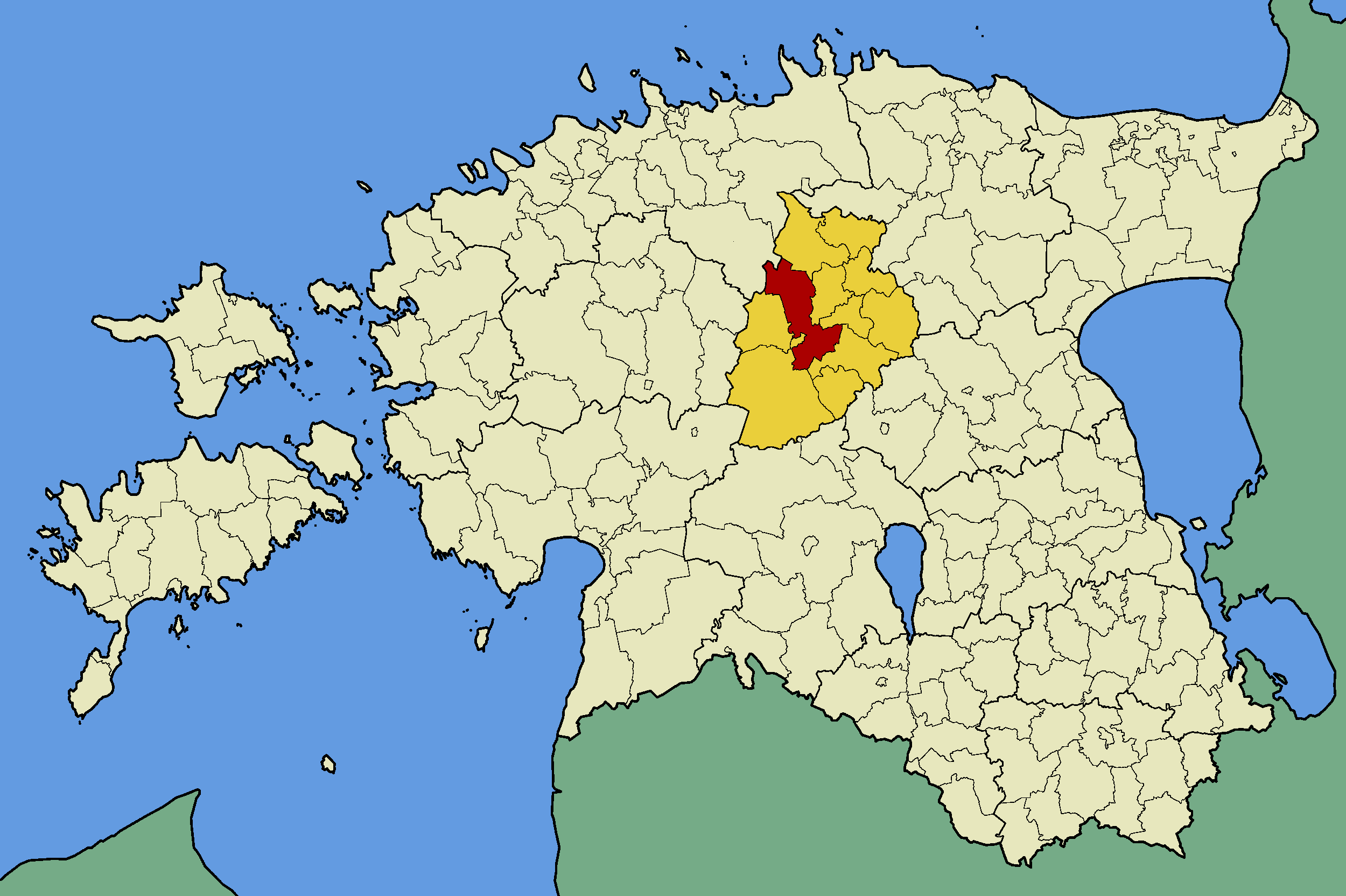
- Paide Parish within Järva County.
- Country: Estonia
- County: Järva County
- Administrative centre: Paide

Area
  - Total: 300 km^{2} (120 sq mi)

Population (2004)
  - Total: 1,935
  - Density: 6.4/km^{2} (17/sq mi)
- Website: www.paidevald.ee

Paide Parish (Estonian: Paide vald) was a rural municipality of Estonia, in Järva County. It had a population of 1935 (as of 2004) and an area of 300 km².

Nurmsi Airfield (ICAO: EENI) is located in the parish. During the Cold War, it hosted a front-line fighter air base "Koigi".

== Villages ==
Anna - Eivere - Kirila - Korba - Kriilevälja - Mäeküla - Mäo - Mustla - Mustla-Nõmme - Mündi - Nurme - Nurmsi - Ojaküla - Otiku - Pikaküla - Prääma - Puiatu - Purdi - Sargvere - Seinapalu - Sillaotsa - Sõmeru - Suurpalu - Tarbja - Valgma - Veskiaru - Viraksaare - Võõbu.

== Gallery ==
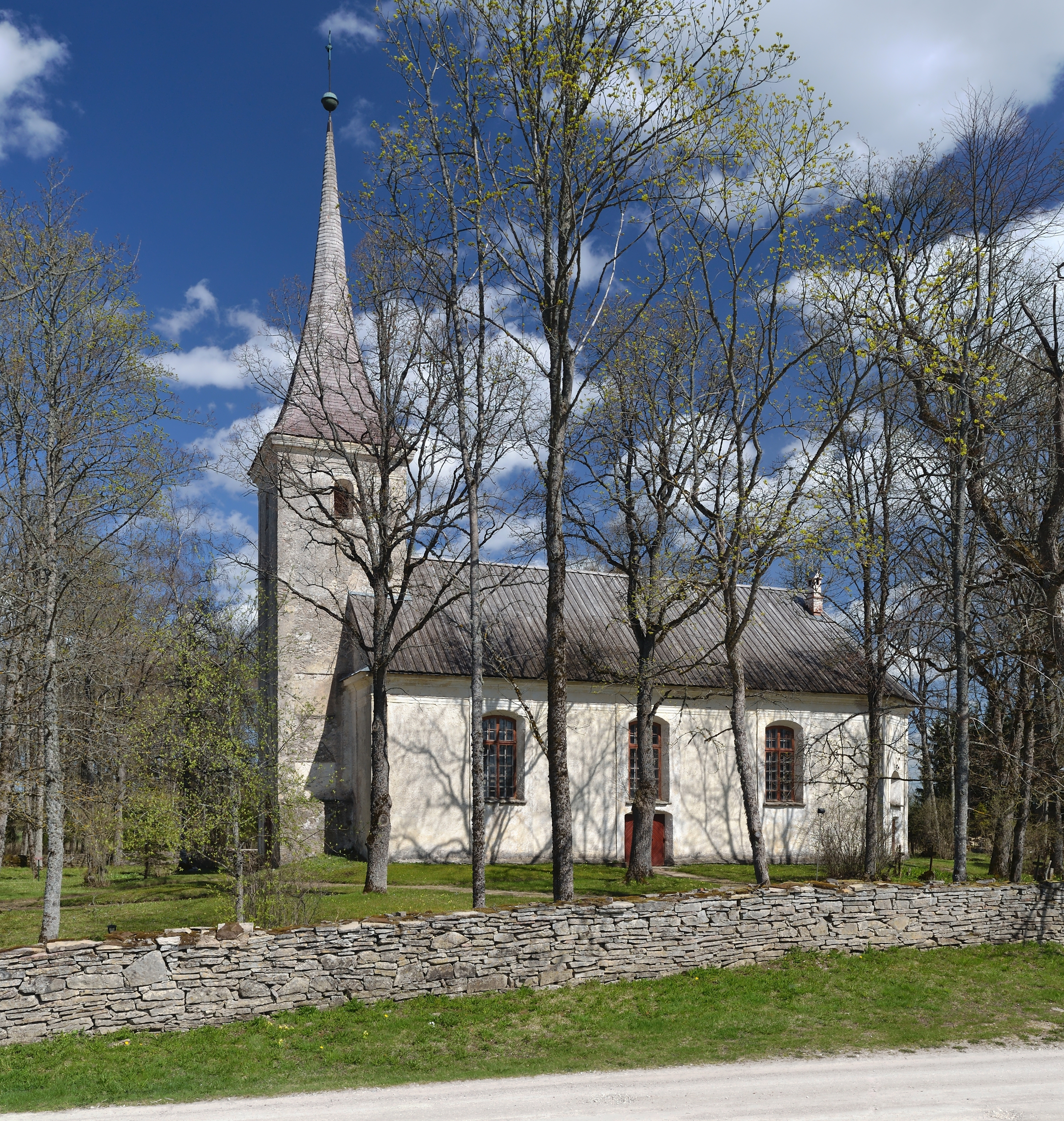
Anna

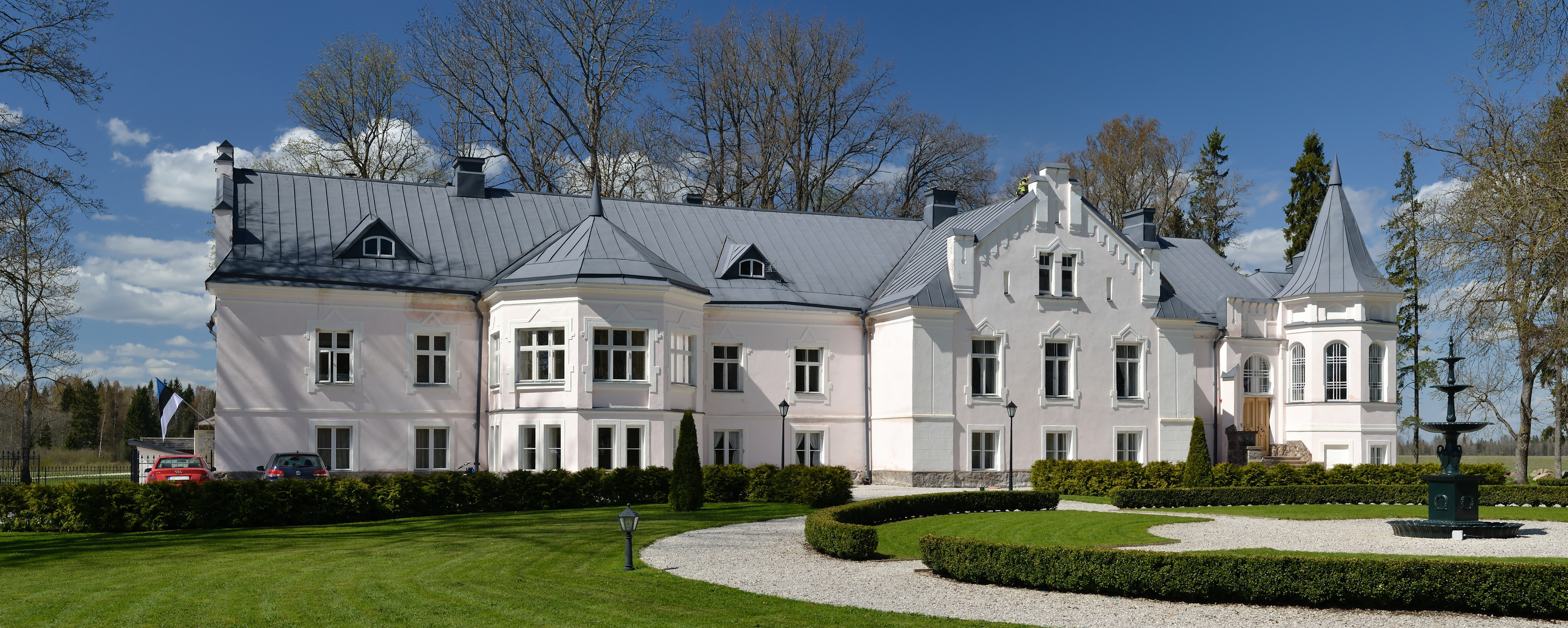
Eivere manor

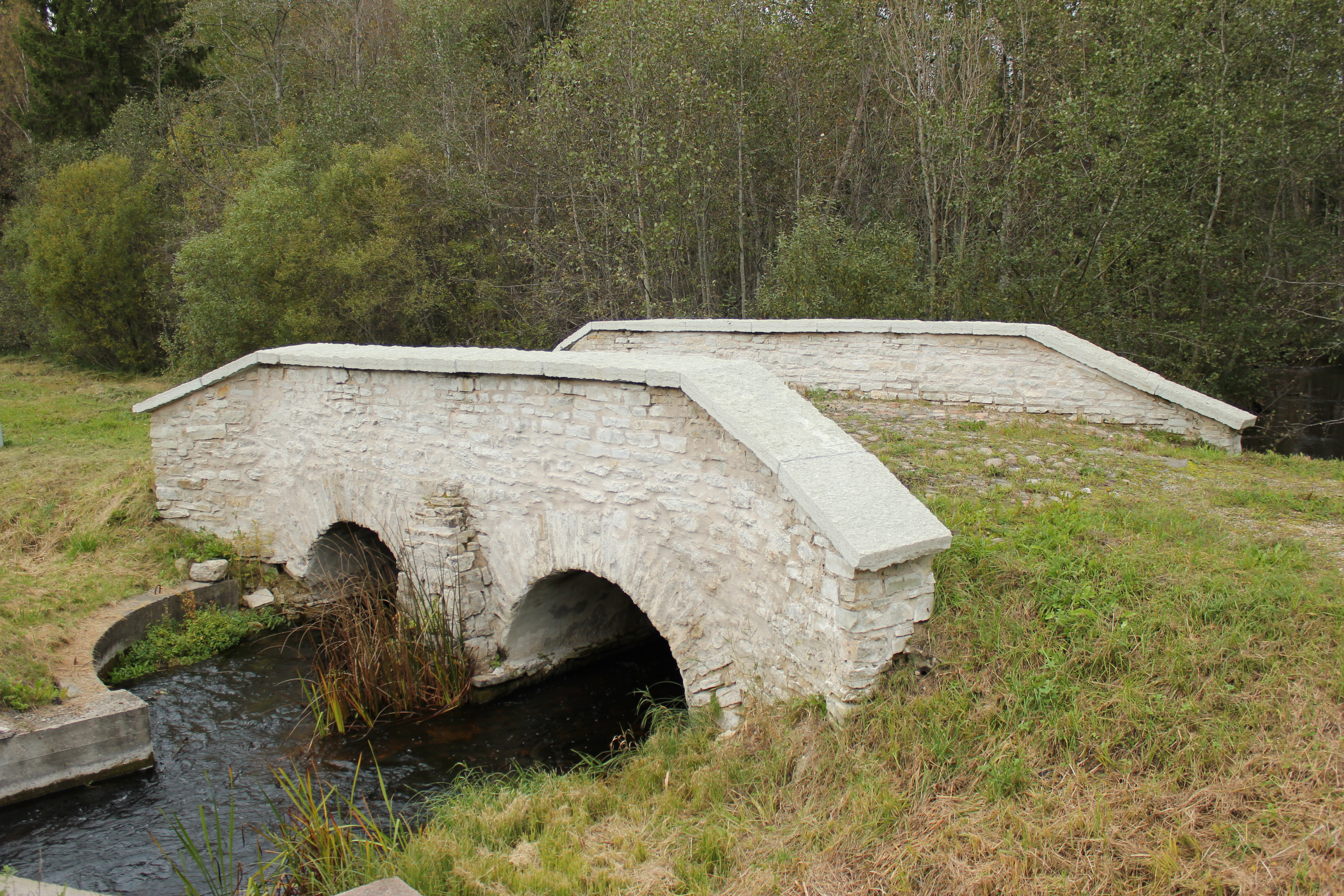
Kükita

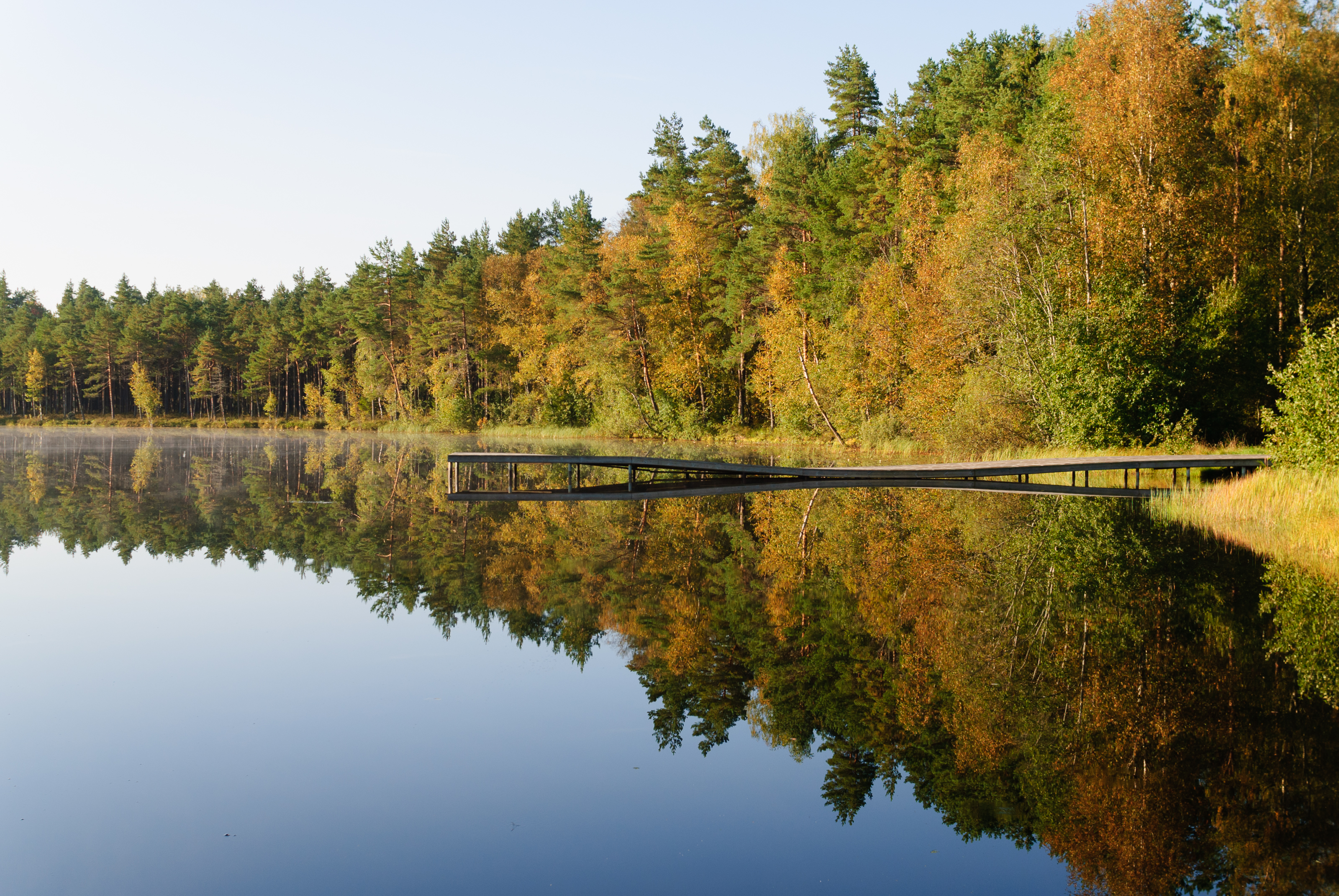
Matsimäe Pühajärv

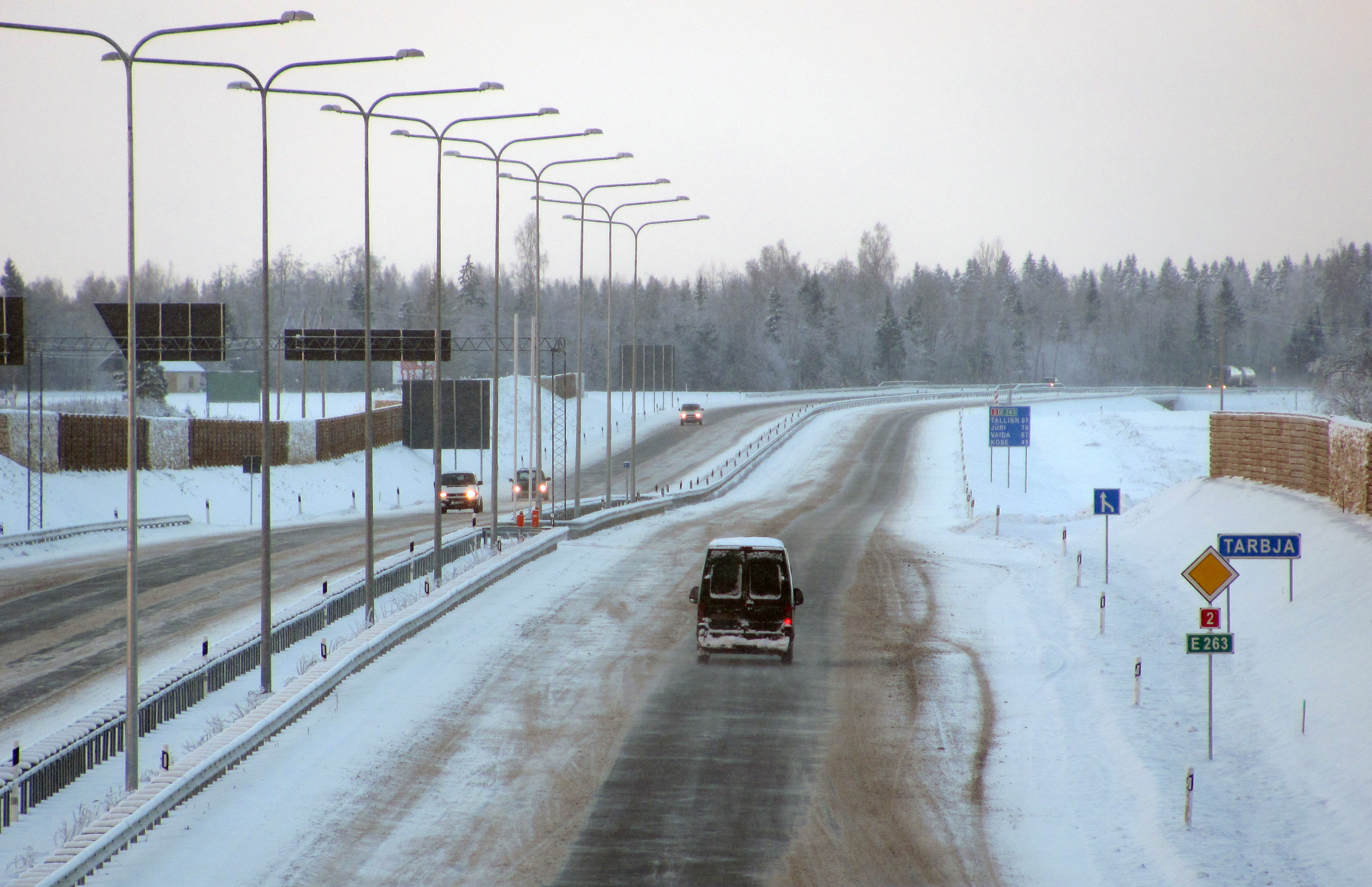
Mäo

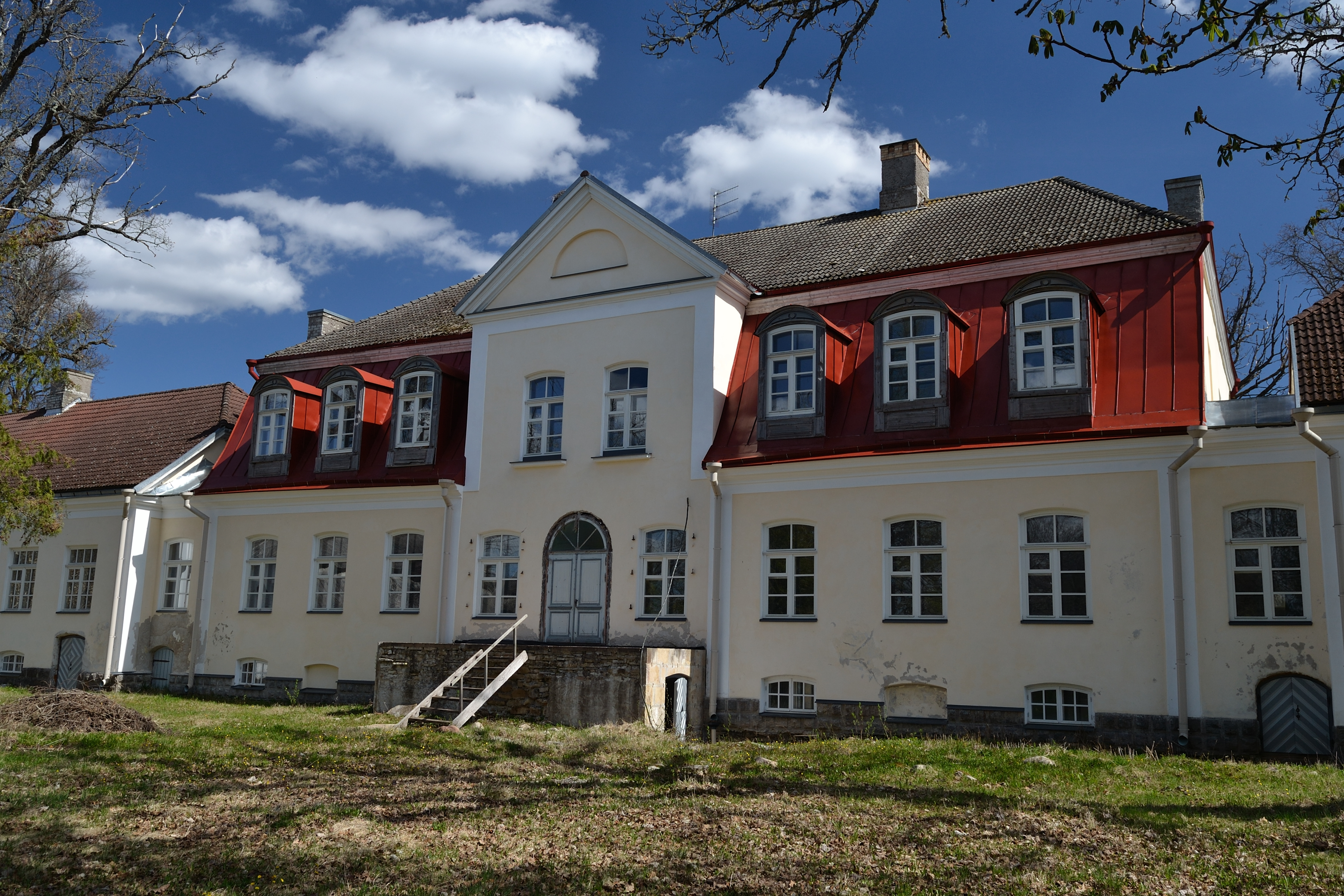
Purdi

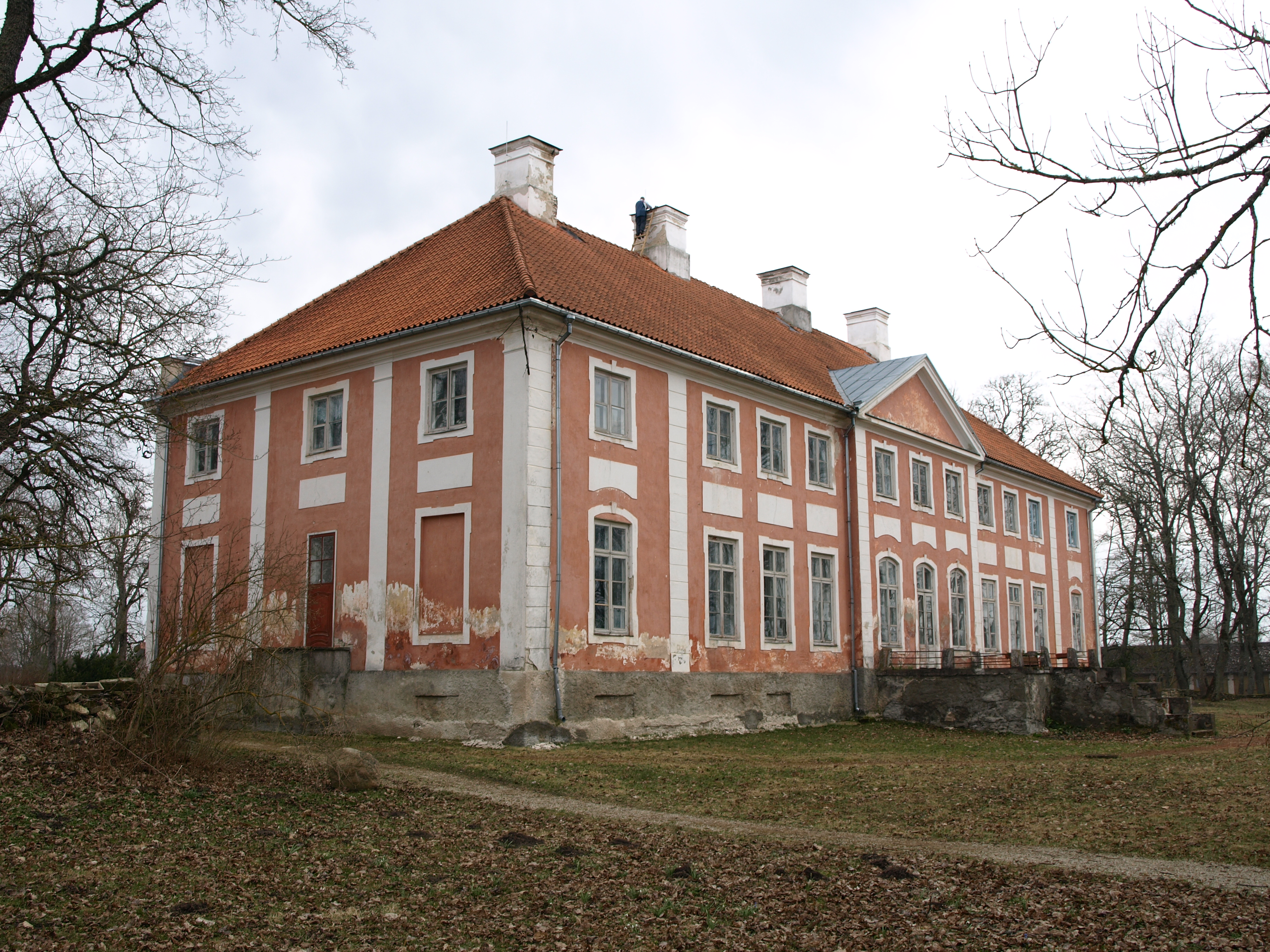
Sargvere

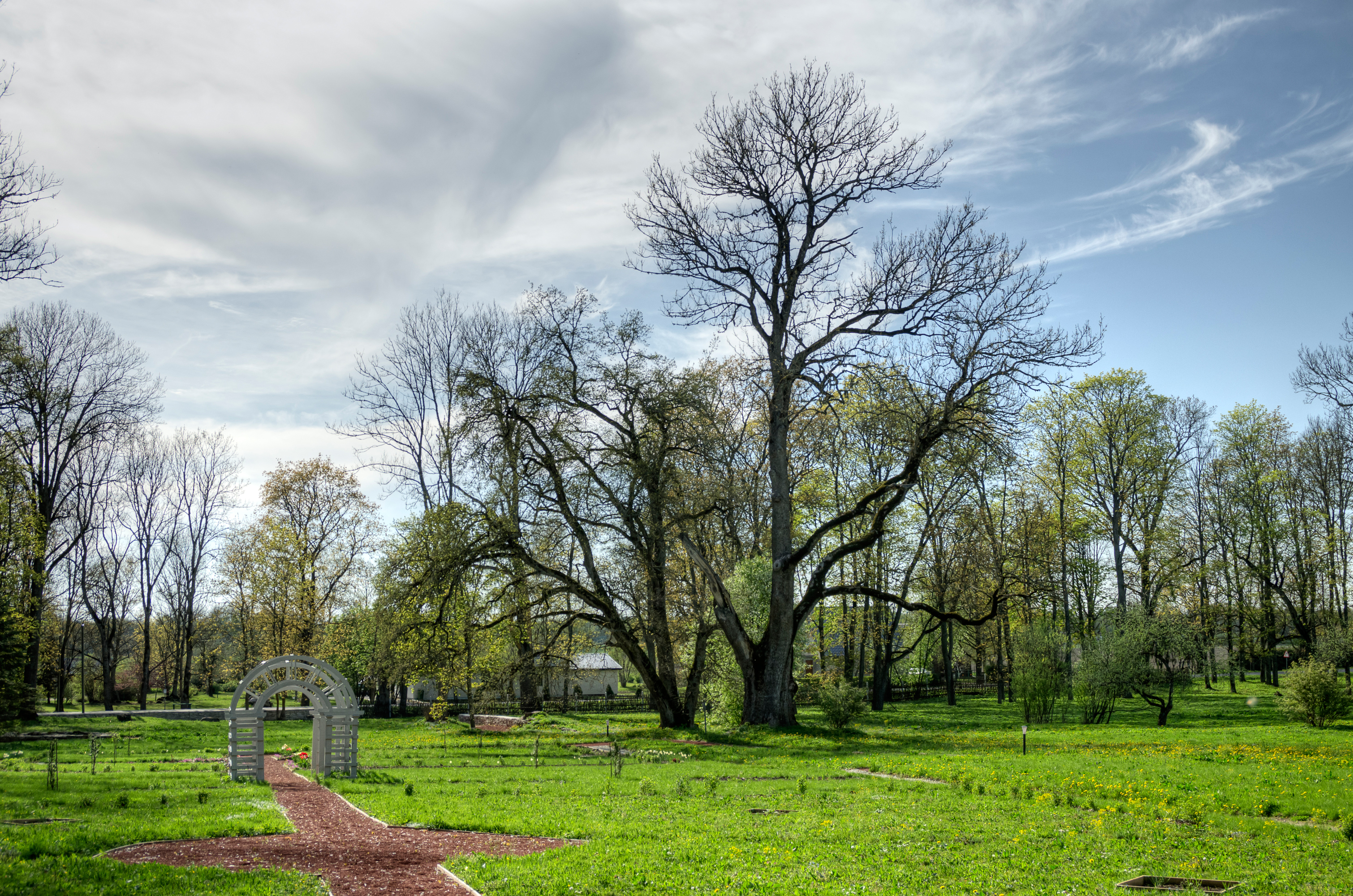
Sargvere manor park

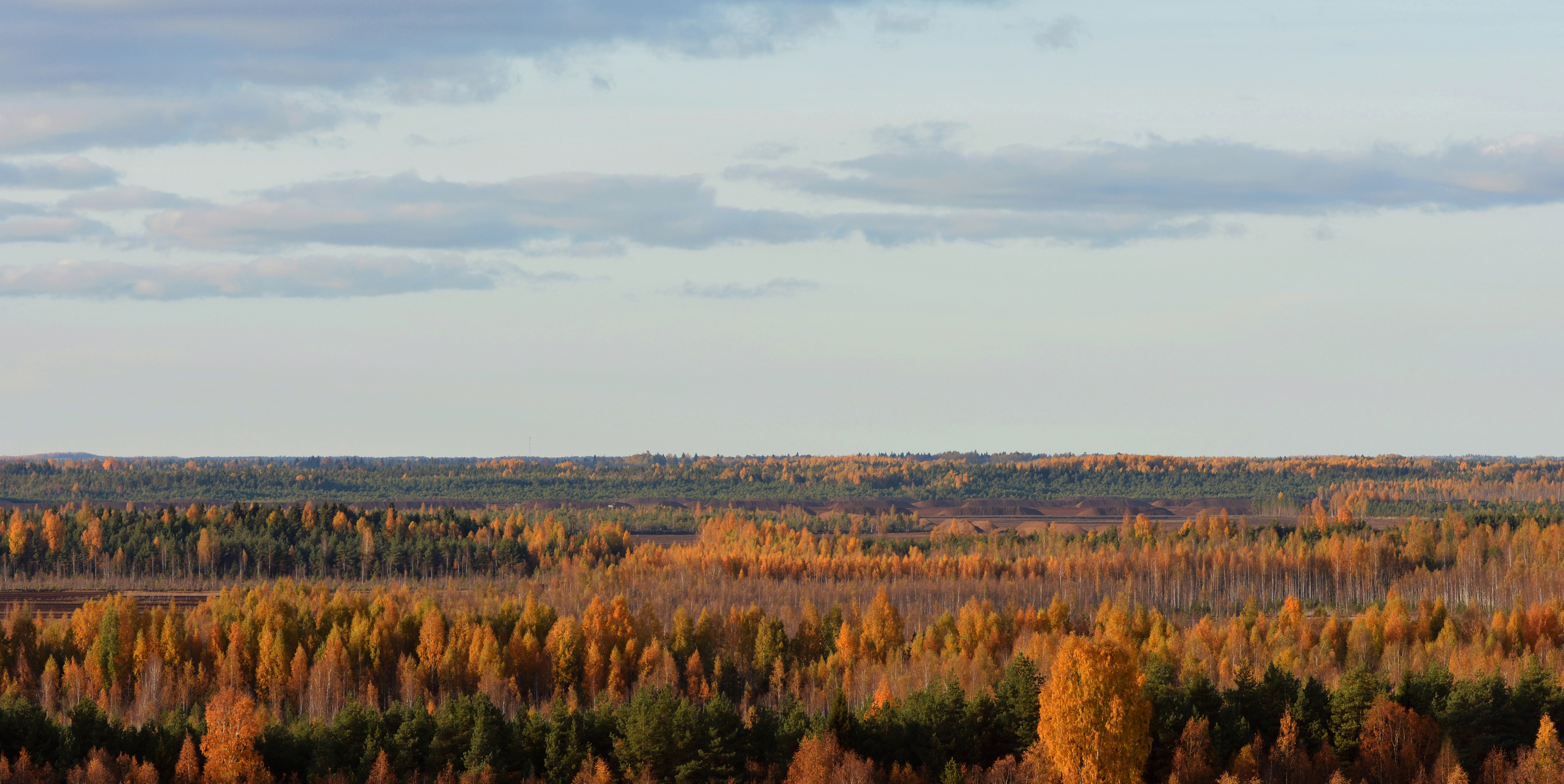
Viraksaare
