= Ekaterina Kalinina =

Spouse of Mikhail Kalinin (1882–1960)

- Екатерина Калинина
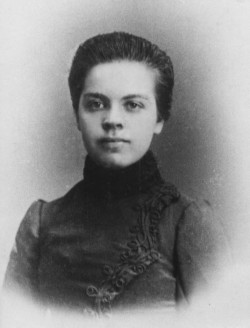
- Born: Jekaterina Lorberg; 2 July 1882; Esna, Kreis Jerwen, Russian Empire
- Died: 22 December 1960 (aged 78); Moscow, Russian SFSR, Soviet Union
- Occupation: Civil servant
- Known for: Wife of Mikhail Kalinin

Ekaterina Kalinina (Russian: Екатерина Ивановна Калинина; née Lorberg; 2 July 1882 – 22 December 1960) was the wife of Soviet politician Mikhail Kalinin, the chair of the Presidium of the Supreme Soviet and formally the head of state from 1938 to 1946. She was in a labor camp between 1938 and 1946 which is called the period of the Great Purge perpetrated by the Soviet ruler Joseph Stalin.

== Early life and marriage ==
Ekaterina Lorberg was born into an ethnic Estonian farmhand's family on 2 July 1882 in the village of Esna near Paide, Estonia (then part of Russian Empire). She was an active revolutionary and worked at a textile factory in Estonia. From 1905 she was actively involved in the Russian revolution. The same year she met Mikhail Kalinin in St. Petersburg where she fled due to her revolutionary activities. There Kalinin was working as a lathe operator. They married in Riga in 1906 and lived in Kalinin's home in the village of Verkhnyaya Troitsa, Tverskaya Gubernia, until 1910. Then they settled in St. Petersburg.

Before the Bolshevik Revolution Kalinina worked in a bottle factory and was a member of the Bolshevik Party. The Kalinins had four children, two sons and two daughters. According to another report the Kalinin family had three children. She along with the children accompanied Kalinin in his exile to Siberia in 1916.

== Career ==
Following the revolution they moved to Moscow. On 30 March 1919, her husband was named head of the party's executive committee and on 30 December 1922, becoming head of the central executive committee. She was one of the active spouses of Soviet leaders. Initially the Kalinins lived in a Kremlin apartment which they shared with the family of Leon Trotsky. They adopted two children and Ekaterina served as the deputy director of a weaving mill in the aftermath of the revolution. She particularly dealt with helping orphans for which she planned to visit the U.S. to raise money. However, she was not given a visa. In 1924, she left Moscow and her family for the Caucasus to be involved in a literacy campaign in the region, but returned to Moscow in the same year. She became the manager of a big state grain farm in a remote district near Novosibirsk, Siberia, in the early 1930s. Then she served as a member of the Supreme Court until 1938.

== Arrest and later life ==
Ekaterina and her friends criticized Joseph Stalin's policies, and informers and operative officers transmitted this information to Stalin. Thus, on 25 October 1938 Ekaterina was arrested on charges of being a Trotskyist. At the time of her arrest Ekaterina and her husband Mikhail Kalinin were not living together. She was tortured in Lefortovo Prison, and on 22 April 1939 she was sentenced to fifteen years of imprisonment in a labor camp in Chemal. She served in the camps (the last one was Ustvymlag) until 14 December 1945 when a special decree of the Presidium ordered her release, which was signed by the secretary of the Presidium, not by her husband, Kalinin. Her release occurred shortly before Kalinin's death. However, she was sent into internal exile shortly after her husband's death. Her official rehabilitation took eight more years, and she finally received a document stating "there was no evidence against her anti-Soviet activities." Ekaterina died on 22 December 1960 at the age of 78.

== See also ==
- Polina Zhemchuzhina
