= Anna, Estonia =

Village in Estonia

- Village
- Anna
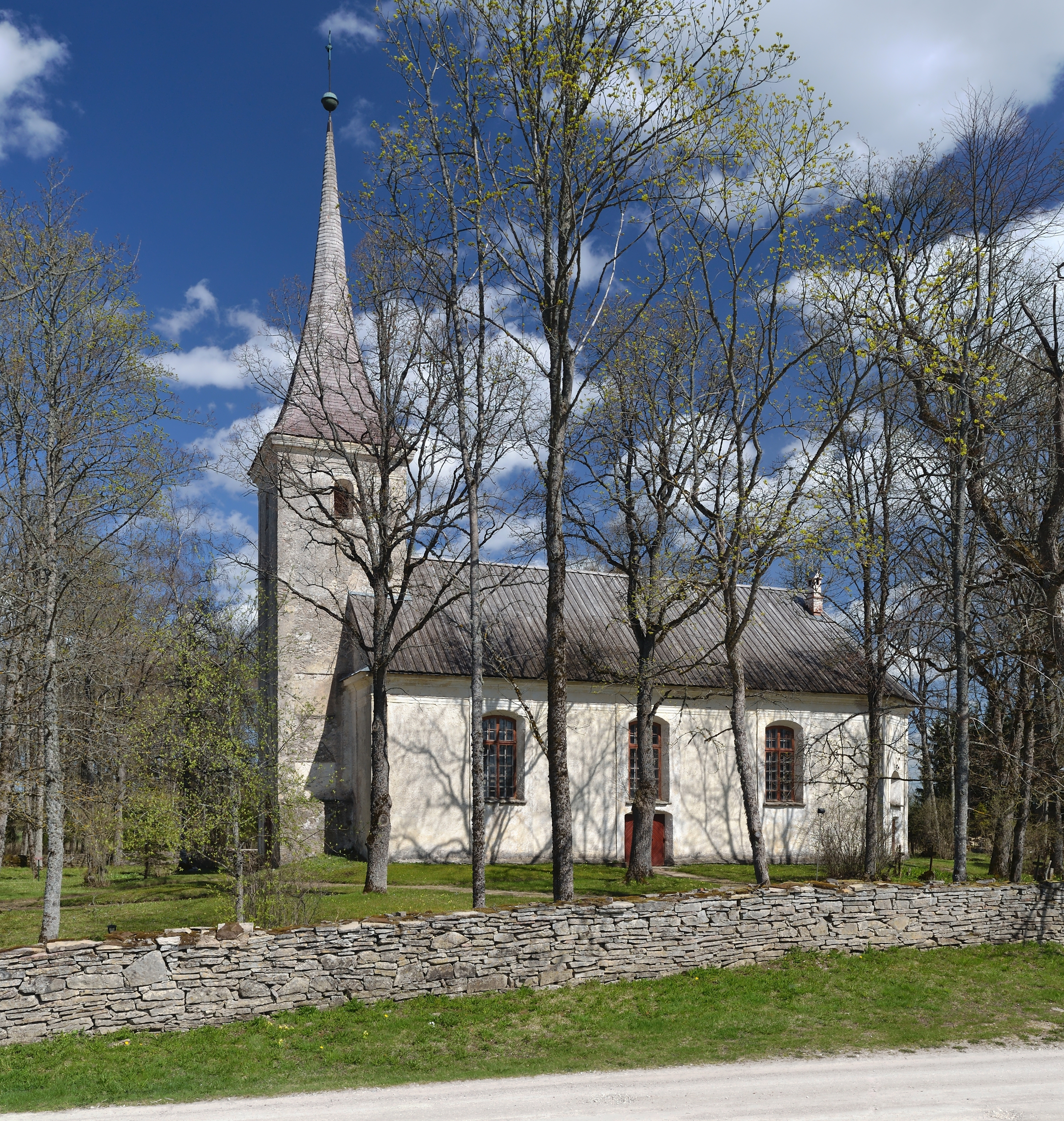
- Anna church

- Location within Estonia
- Coordinates: 59°0′29.07″N 25°35′46.83″E
- Country: Estonia
- County: Järva County
- Municipality: Paide

Population (1 January 2007)
  - Total: 122
- Time zone: UTC+2 (EET)

Anna (German: St. Annen) is a village in Paide municipality, Järva County, in northern-central Estonia. Prior to the 2017 administrative reform in Estonia of local governments, it was located in Paide Parish.
