= Mündi =

Village in Estonia

- Village
- Location within Estonia
- Coordinates: 58°52′N 25°35′E
- Country: Estonia
- County: Järva County
- Municipality: Paide
- Time zone: UTC+2 (EET)
  - Summer (DST): UTC+3 (EEST)

Mündi (German: Müntenhof) is a village in Paide municipality, Järva County in northern-central Estonia, known for its manor. Prior to the 2017 administrative reform of local governments, it was located in Paide Parish.
