= Tännapere =

Village in Estonia

Coordinates: 58°59′N 25°45′E

- Village
- Interactive map of Tännapere
- Country: Estonia
- County: Järva County
- Municipality: Paide
- Time zone: UTC+2 (EET)
  - Summer (DST): UTC+3 (EEST)

Tännapere is a village in Paide municipality, Järva County, in northern-central Estonia. Prior to the 2017 administrative reform in Estonia of local governments, it was located in Roosna-Alliku Parish.
