= Elmar Muuk =

Estonian linguist

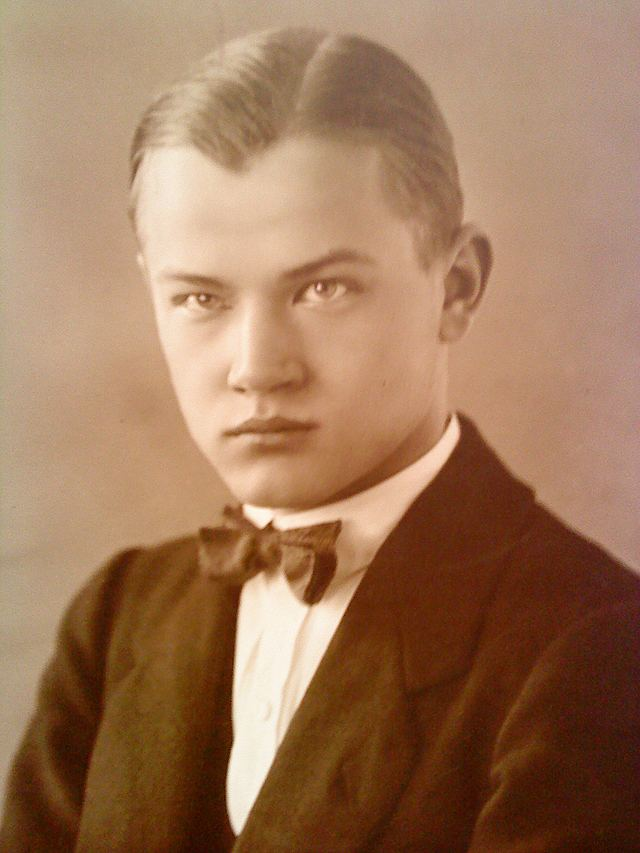
- Muuk in 1923
- Born: 26 December 1901; Eivere, Kreis Jerwen, Governorate of Estonia, Russian Empire (now Estonia)
- Died: 20 November 1941 (aged 39); Sevurallag, Sverdlovsk Oblast, Russian SFSR, Soviet Union (now Russia)
- Occupations: Linguist, author

Elmar Muuk (26 December 1901 – 20 November 1941) was an Estonian linguist, lexicographer, and author of a number of dictionaries and textbooks of the Estonian language, and was, together with Johannes Voldemar Veski and Johannes Aavik, responsible for development of Estonian as a modern European language.

Muuk was born in Eivere village, in the Kreis Jerwen of the Governorate of Estonia. He took part of the Estonian War of Independence. Muuk was arrested by NKVD on 14 June 1941 in Tallinn and died in imprisonment in Sevurallag, Sverdlovsk oblast.

== Sources ==
- Eesti Ekspress 23 August 2007: Mahalaskmine pärast surma by Margit-Mariann Koppel
- Estonian Language Institute: Eesti keele kirjeldamise ja arendamise ajaloost
