= Eivere =

Village in Estonia

- Village
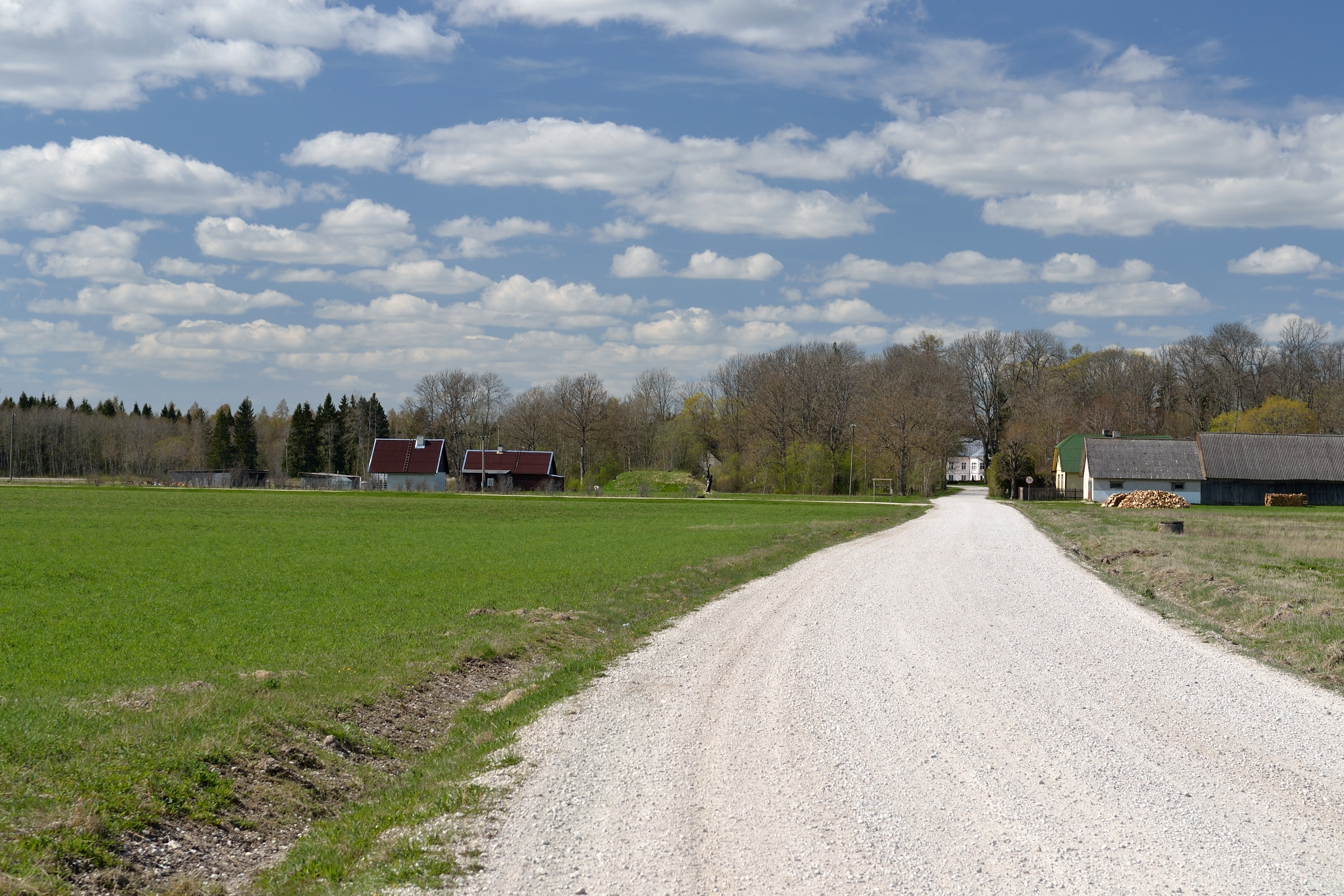
- Eivere village

- Location in Estonia
- Coordinates: 58°57′N 25°33′E
- Country: Estonia
- County: Järva County
- Municipality: Paide
- Time zone: UTC+2 (EET)
  - Summer (DST): UTC+3 (EEST)

Eivere (German: Eyefer) is a village in Paide municipality, Järva County in northern-central Estonia. Prior to the 2017 administrative reform of local governments, it was located in Paide Parish.

Linguist Elmar Muuk (1901–1941) was born in Eivere.

== Eivere manor ==
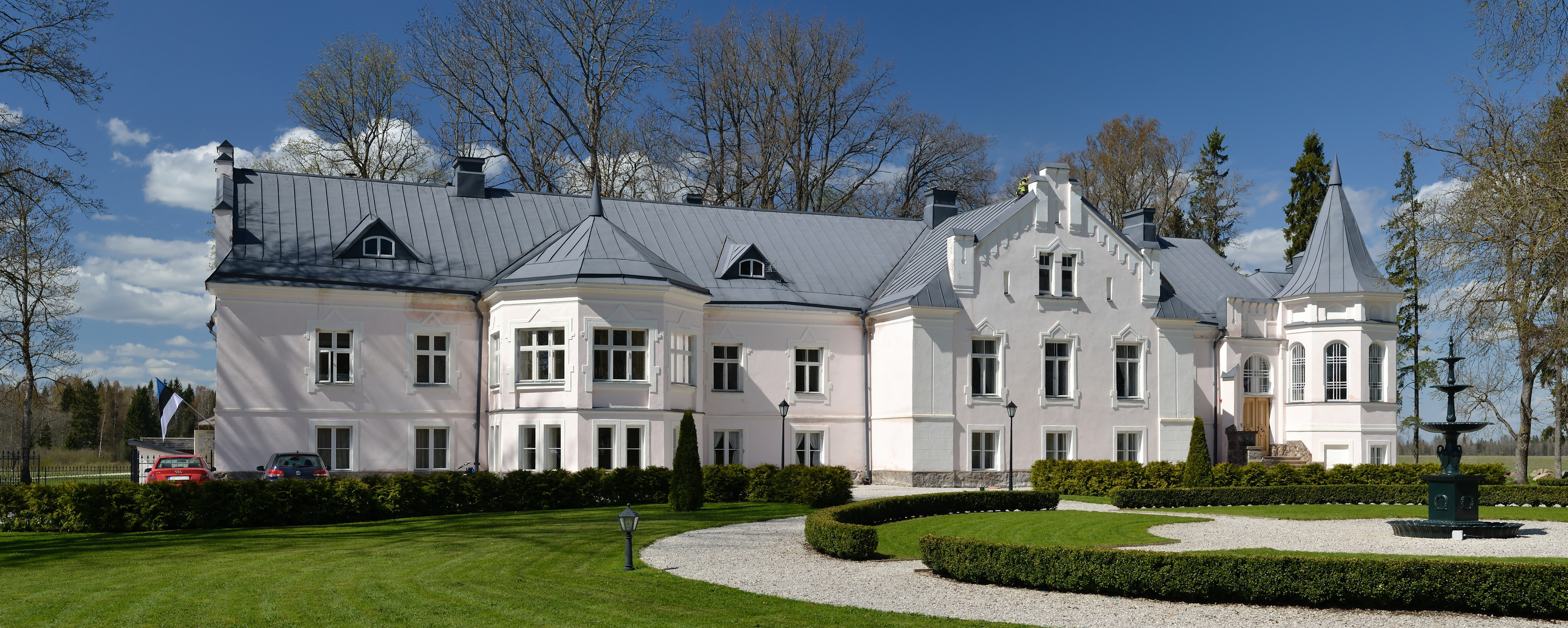
Eivere manor

Eivere estate (German: Eyefer) was first mentioned in 1552. The current manor house was built around 1912 in an eclectic style, mixing neo-Gothic and Art Nouveau elements.
