= Prääma =

Village in Estonia

- Village
- Location within Estonia
- Coordinates: 58°53′40″N 25°32′11″E
- Country: Estonia
- County: Järva County
- Municipality: Paide

Population (2007)
  - Total: 32
- Time zone: UTC+2 (EET)
  - Summer (DST): UTC+3 (EEST)

Prääma (German: Bremerfeld) is a village in Paide municipality, Järva County in northern-central Estonia. It is located just north of Paide. As of 2007, it had a population of 32 people. Prior to the 2017 administrative reform of local governments, it was located in Paide Parish.
