= Purdi =

Village in Estonia

Coordinates: 58°59′N 25°36′E

- Village
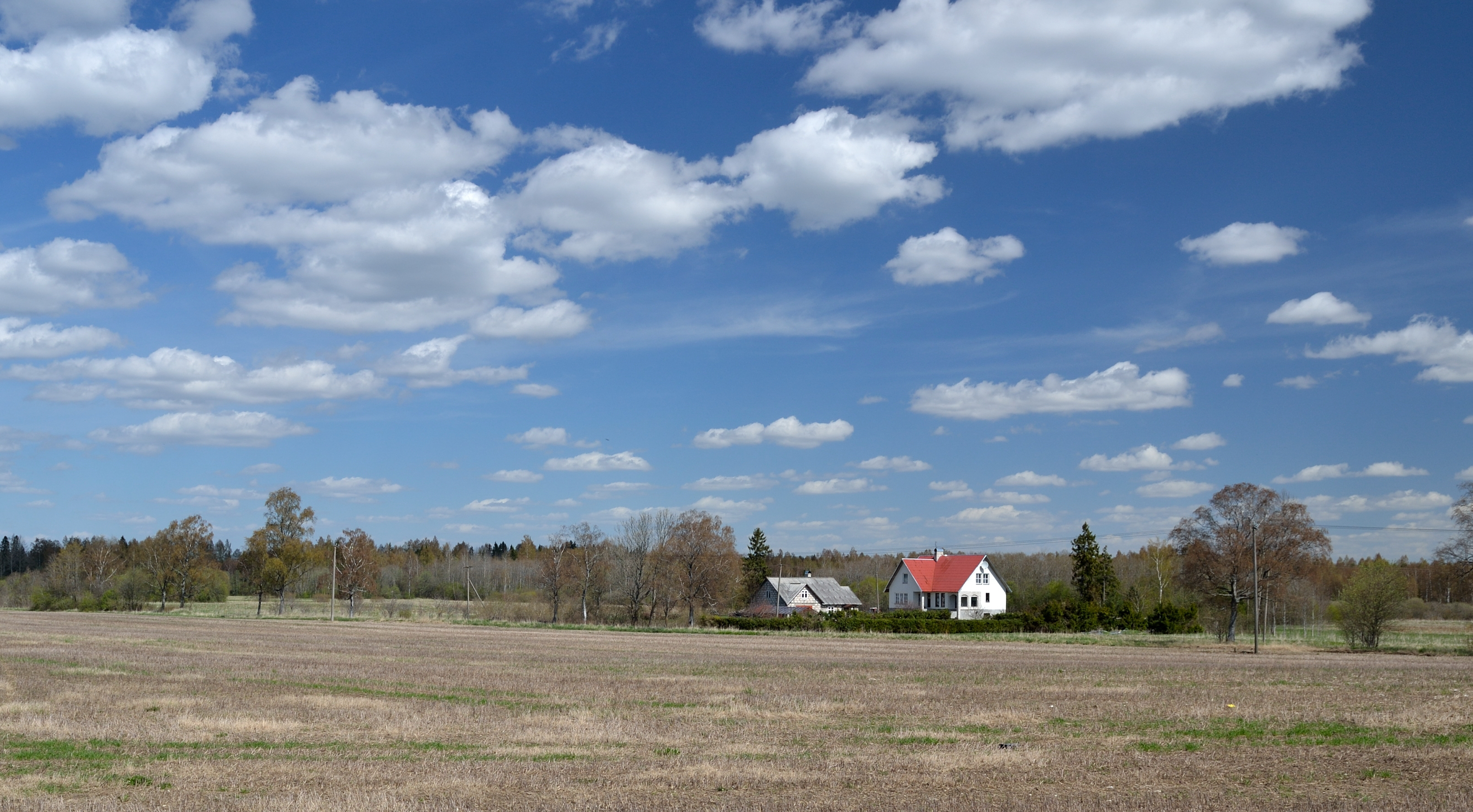
- Interactive map of Purdi
- Country: Estonia
- County: Järva County
- Municipality: Paide
- Time zone: UTC+2 (EET)
  - Summer (DST): UTC+3 (EEST)

Purdi is a village in Paide municipality, Järva County in northern-central Estonia. Prior to the 2017 administrative reform of local governments, it was located in Paide Parish.

== Purdi manor ==
Purdi manor (German: Noistfer) has a history that goes back to at least 1560. The current building is a baroque manor house, built in circa 1760-1770 by the von Baranoff family. Some baroque interiors still survive. Additions to the building were made in the 19th century. Several annexes belonging to the estate are still preserved, notably the granary, as well as the baroque burial chapel of the Ungern-Sternberg family, who were the last feudal landlords of the estate.

== Gallery ==
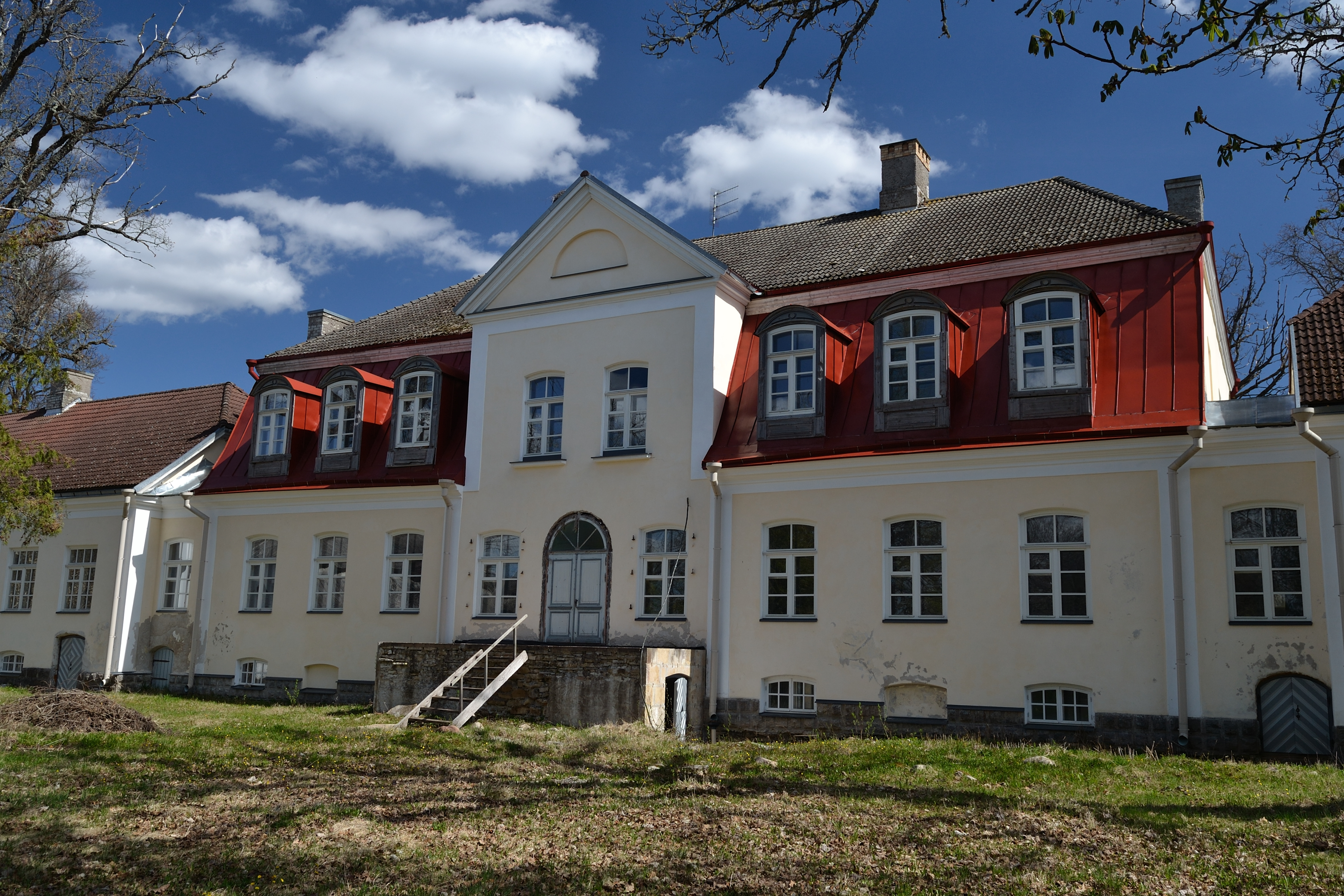
Purdi manor main building

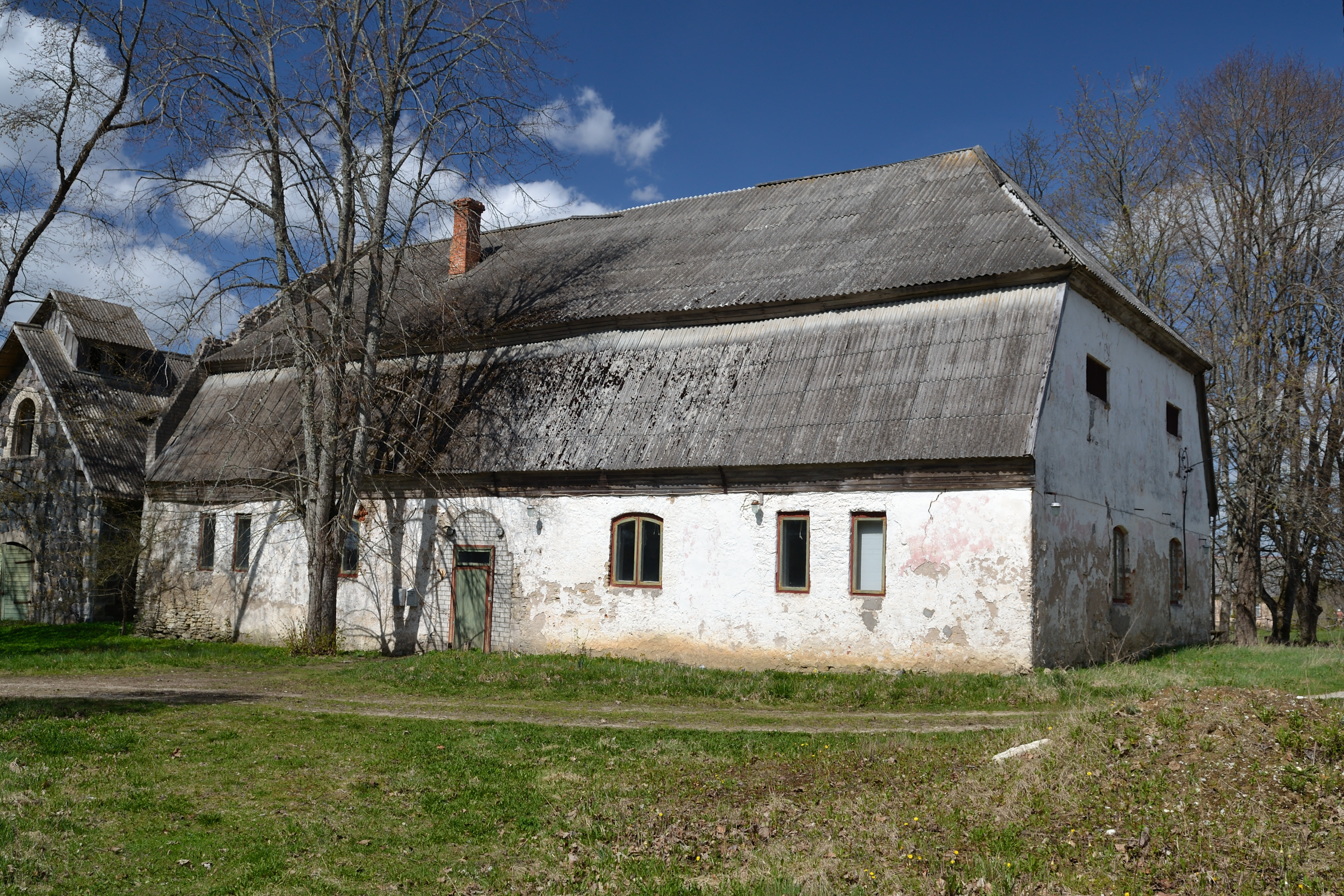
Granary

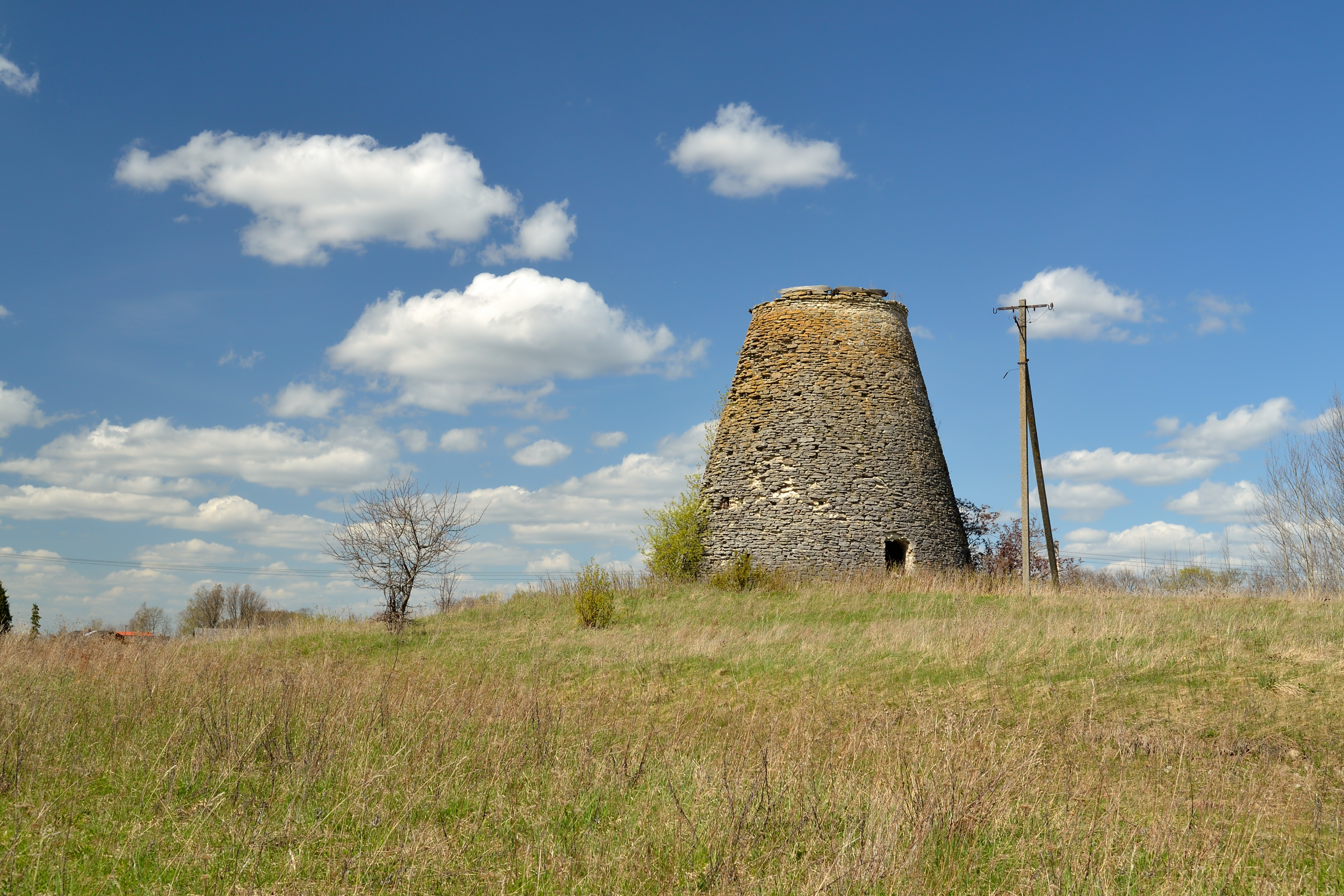
Windmill

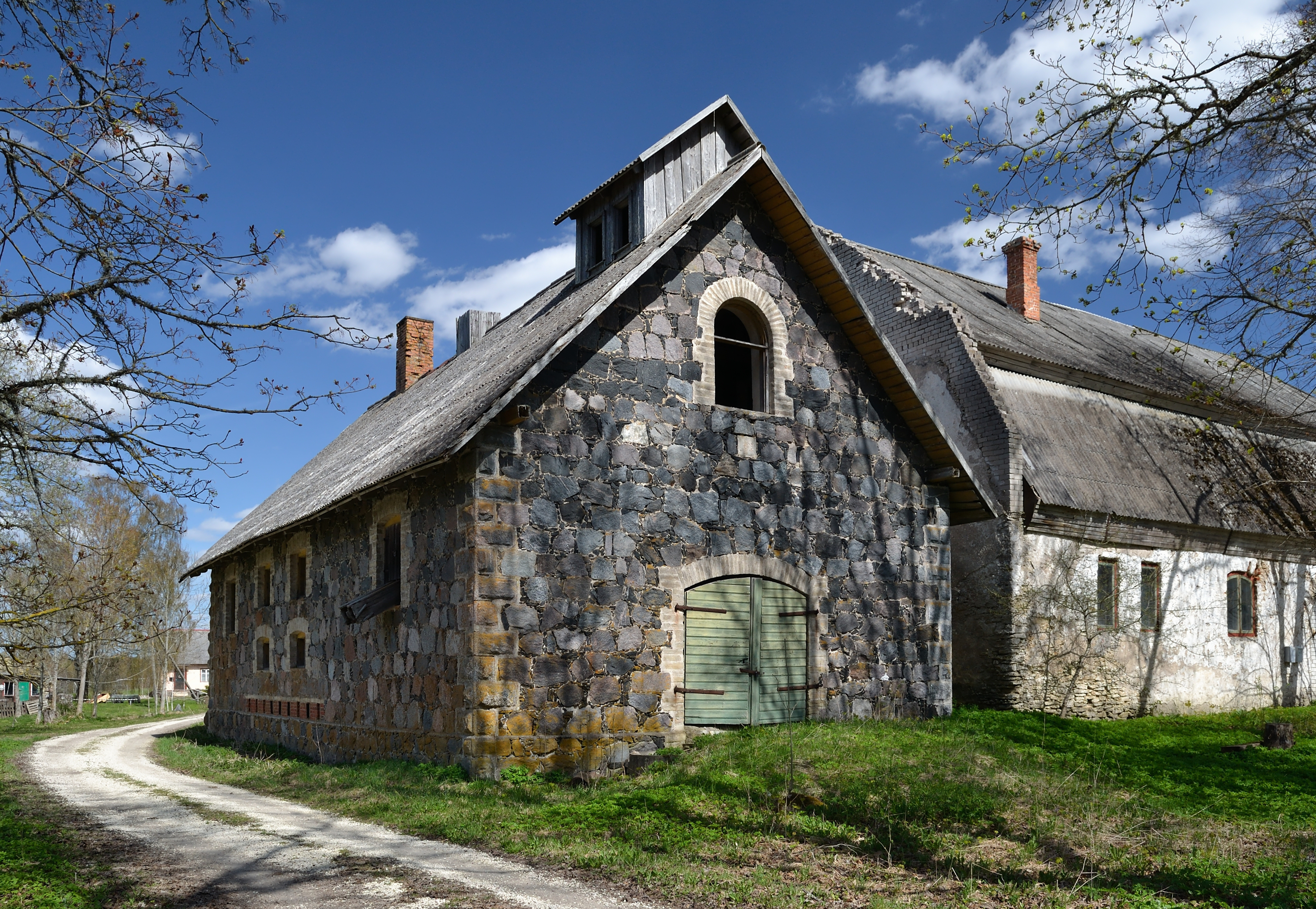
Cereal dryer

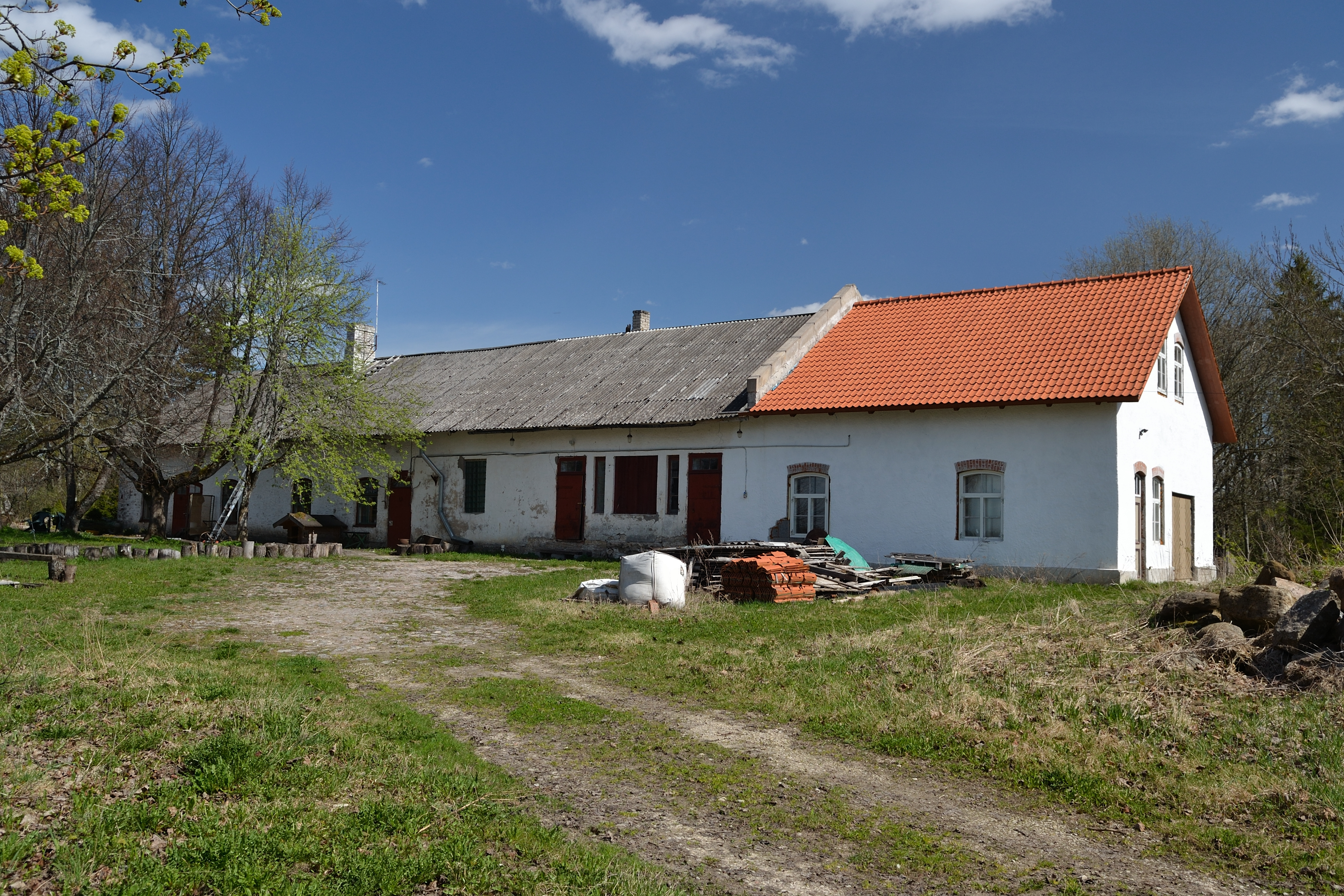
Workers house

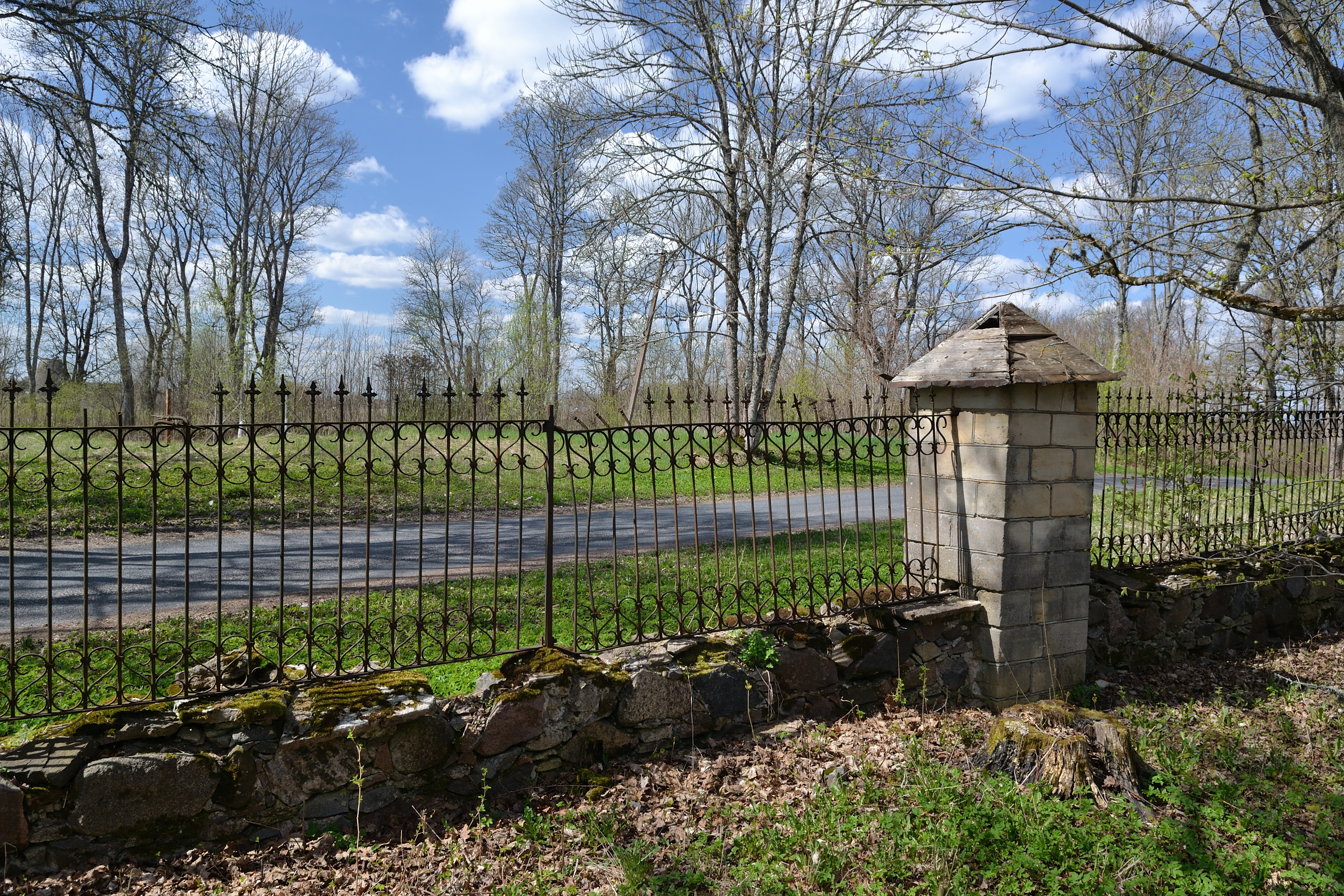
Park enclosure wall

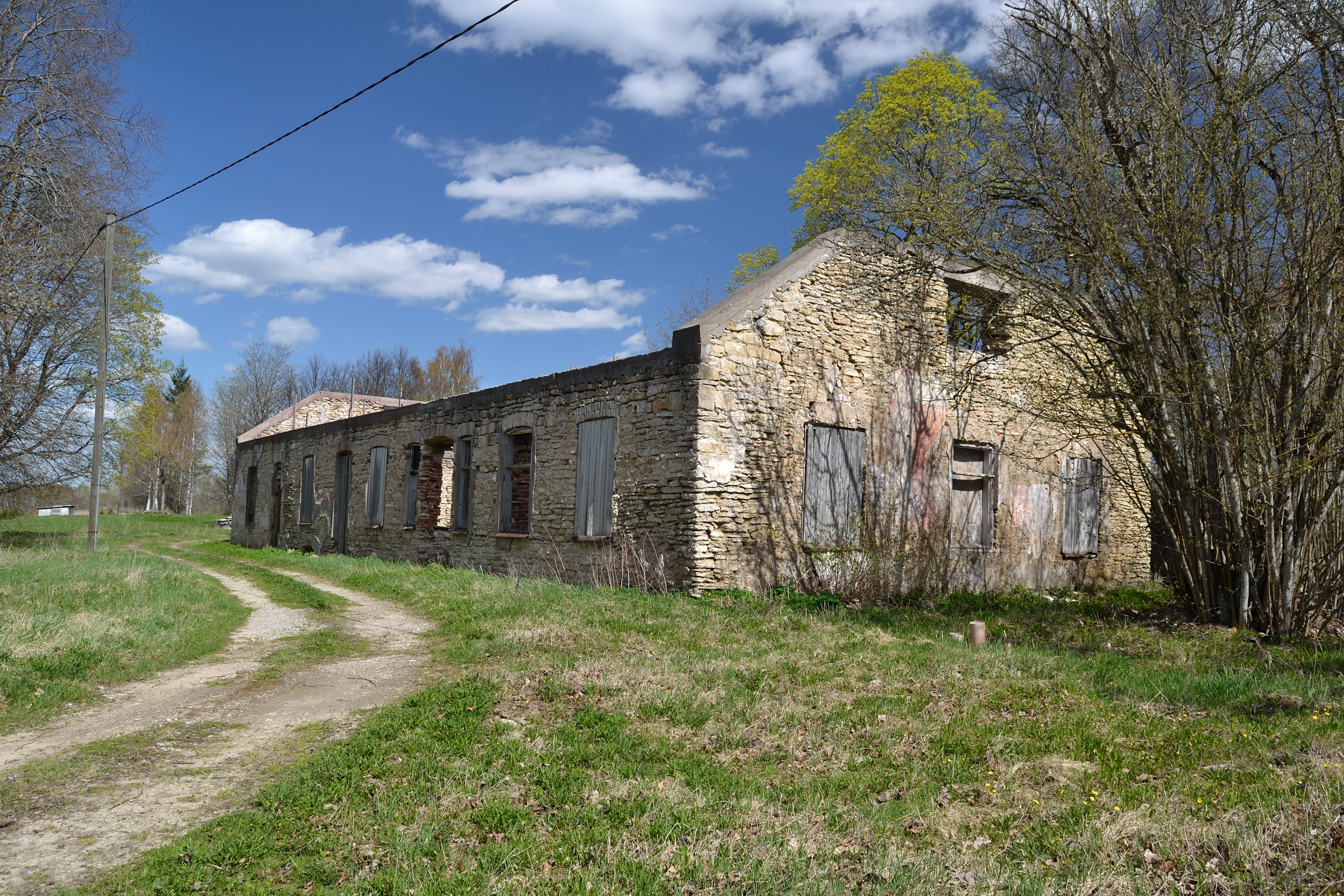
Steward's house ruins

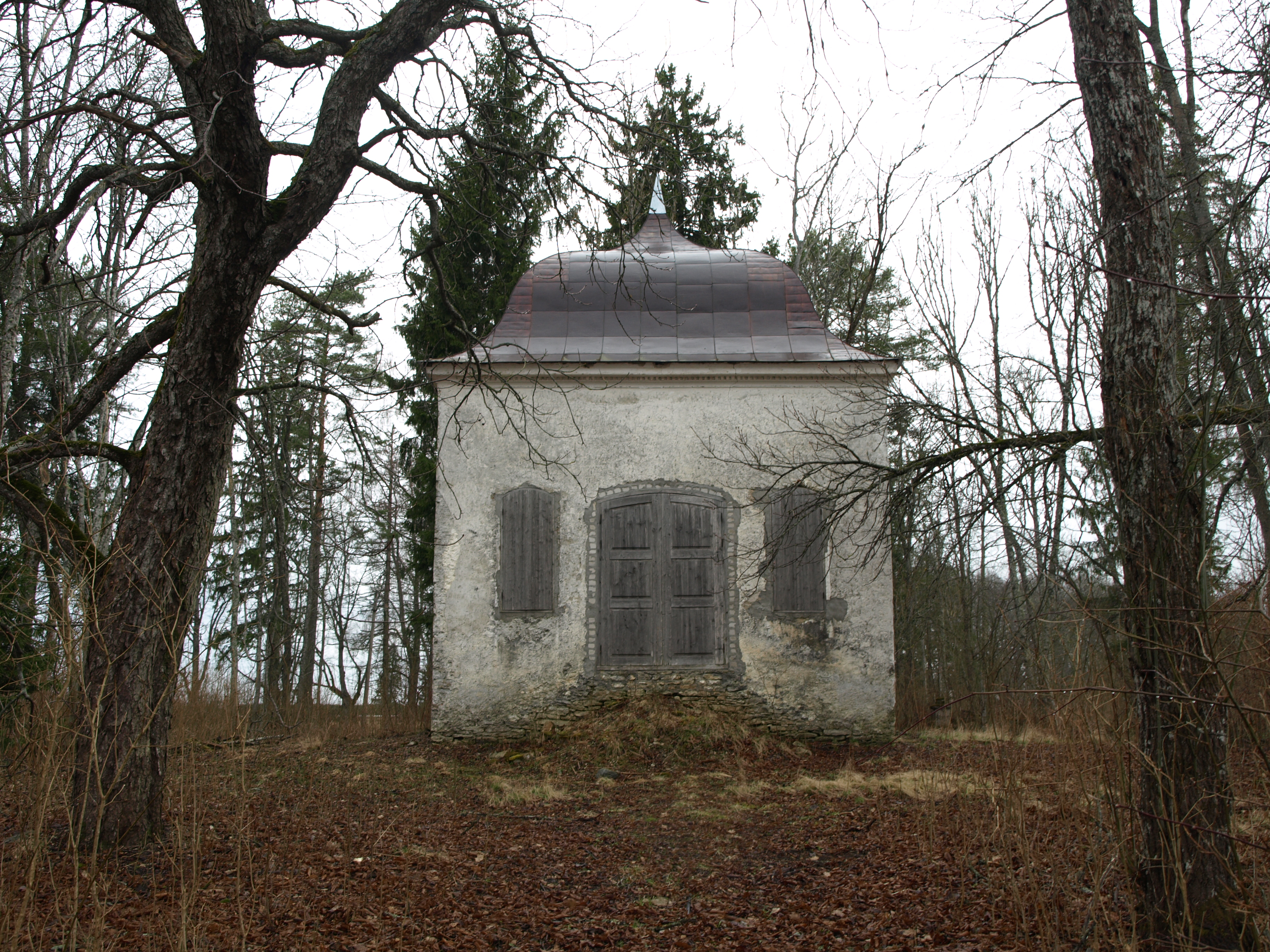
von Ungern-Sternberg family burial chapel

== People ==
- Alexander von Ungern-Sternberg (1806-1869), German writer, painter and poet
