= Nurme, Järva County =

Village in Estonia

Coordinates: 59°01′38″N 25°35′18″E

Nurme
- Village
- Interactive map of Nurme
- Country: Estonia
- County: Järva County
- Municipality: Paide
- Time zone: UTC+2 (EET)
  - Summer (DST): UTC+3 (EEST)

Nurme is a village in Paide municipality, Järva County in northern-central Estonia. Prior to the 2017 administrative reform of local governments, it was located in Paide Parish.
