= Urmas Rooba =

Estonian footballer (born 1978)

Personal information
- Full name: Urmas Rooba
- Date of birth: 8 July 1978 (age 48)
- Place of birth: Kaaruka, then part of Estonian SSR, Soviet Union
- Height: 1.79 m (5 ft 10 1/2 in)
- Position: Left back

Youth career
- FC Lelle
- Lelle SK
- JK Tervis Pärnu

Senior career*
Years	Team	Apps	(Gls)
1995	JK Tervis Pärnu	3	(0)
1996–2000	FC Flora Tallinn	42	(1)
2000–2002	FC Midtjylland	63	(0)
2002–2006	F.C. Copenhagen	33	(0)
2006–2007	Vejle Boldklub	1	(0)
2007–2008	Turun Palloseura	28	(0)
2009	FC Flora Tallinn	12	(0)
2009	→ FF Jaro (loan)	6	(0)
2010–2014	Paide Linnameeskond	40	(1)

International career
1996–2008	Estonia	70	(1)

Managerial career
- 2016: Paide Linnameeskond (assistant)
- * Club domestic league appearances and goals as of 1 June 2010

Urmas Rooba (born 8 July 1978 in Kaaruka) is a retired Estonian footballer, who last played for Paide Linnameeskond in Meistriliiga. He played the position of defender.

== Club career ==
Rooba played for FC Midtjylland before he joined FC København. He was injury plagued at the Danish capital, and moved to Vejle Boldklub in 2006, but because of his injuries he waited until 20 May 2007 to make his debut for the first team. In his FC Midtjylland days was touted as one of the best defenders in the Danish league, before injury after injury has put his playing career on a downfall.

He has also played in FC Lelle, Lelle SK, JK Tervis Pärnu and TPS.

== International career ==
He has made 70 appearances for Estonian national team and has scored 1 goal.

== Personal ==
Rooba is the brother of former Estonian international Meelis Rooba, who made 50 caps for the national team between 1996 and 2004.

== Career statistics ==
=== International ===
Appearances and goals by national team and year
National team	Year	Apps	Goals
Estonia	1996	7	1
Estonia	1997	3	0
Estonia	1998	7	0
Estonia	2000	4	0
Estonia	2000	6	0
Estonia	2001	11	0
Estonia	2002	7	0
Estonia	2003	9	0
Estonia	2004	5	0
Estonia	2005	4	0
Estonia	2006	1	0
Estonia	2007	3	0
Estonia	2008	3	0
Total		70	1

Scores and results list Estonia's goal tally first, score column indicates score after each Rooba goal.

List of international goals scored by Urmas Rooba
No.	Date	Venue	Opponent	Score	Result	Competition
1	7 July 1996	Narva Kreenholm Stadium, Narva, Estonia	Latvia	1–1	1–1	1996 Baltic Cup
