= Roosna-Alliku =

Borough in Estonia

Coordinates: 59°02′N 25°42′E

- Small borough
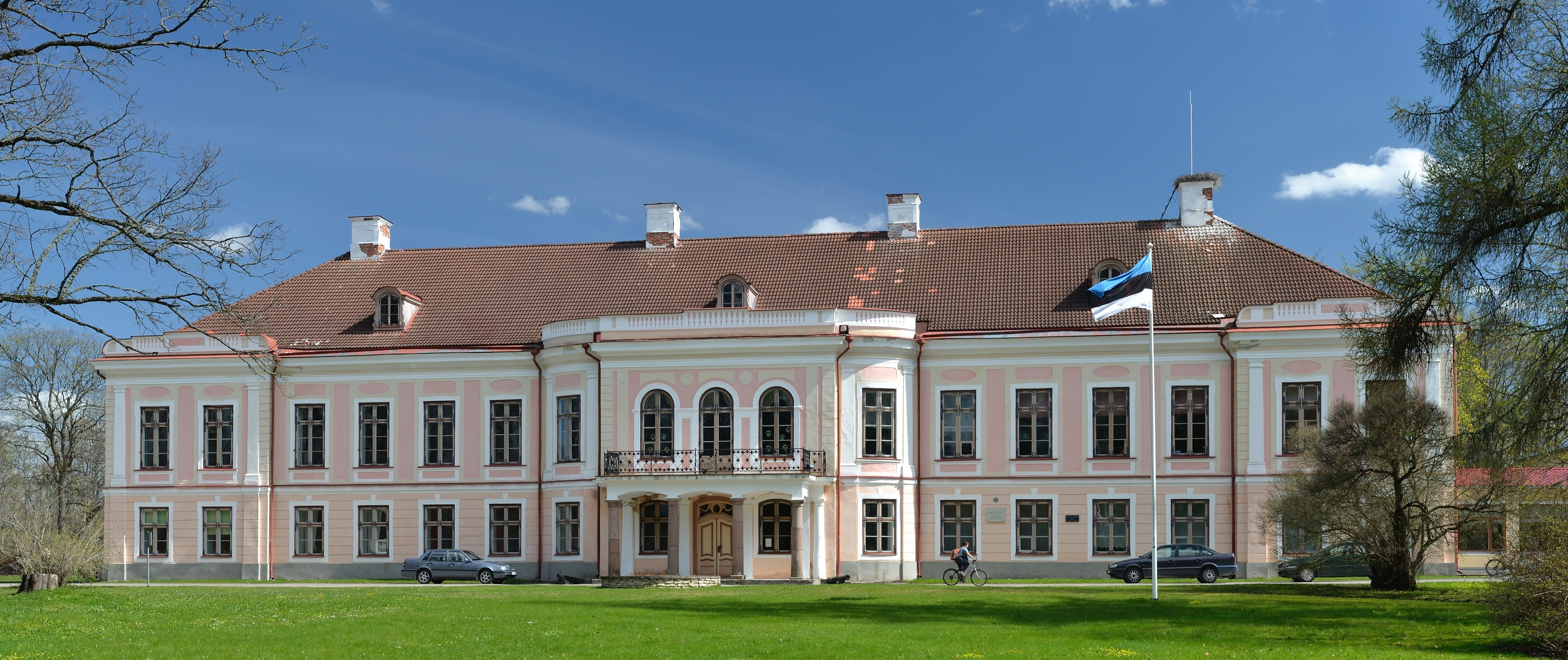
- Roosna-Alliku Manor
- Interactive map of Roosna-Alliku
- Country: Estonia
- County: Järva County
- Municipality: Paide
- Time zone: UTC+2 (EET)
  - Summer (DST): UTC+3 (EEST)

Roosna-Alliku (German: Kaltenbrunn) is a small borough in Paide municipality, Järva County in northern-central Estonia. Prior to the 2017 administrative reform in Estonia of local governments, it was the administrative centre of Roosna-Alliku Parish.

== Roosna-Alliku manor ==
References to Roosna-Alliku go back to the 16th century, and the estate has over the centuries belonged to several distinguished Baltic German aristocratic families. The name is a reference to the von Rosen family. The current building was built during the ownership of the von Stackelberg family.

The building was erected in 1780-1786 after plans by architect Johann Schultz. Schultz was a popular architect of manor houses in Estonia, who also designed the baroque extension of Toompea Castle, Tallinn. Some very fine and comprehensive interiors from this time are still preserved complete with the original colour scheme, notably the hall and the "blue salon". The rich stucco decorations were made by Bohemian stucco master Karl Kalopka, and include typical details in rococo style such as putti, trophies and sheaves, and the owners' coat of arms.
