= Ojaküla, Järva County =

Village in Estonia

Ojaküla
- Village
- Location within Estonia
- Coordinates: 59°00′N 25°34′E
- Country: Estonia
- County: Järva County
- Municipality: Paide
- Time zone: UTC+2 (EET)
  - Summer (DST): UTC+3 (EEST)

Ojaküla is a village in Paide municipality, Järva County in northern-central Estonia. Prior to the 2017 administrative reform of local governments, it was located in Paide Parish.
