= Nurmsi, Järva County =

Village in Estonia

Coordinates: 58°51′48″N 25°42′44″E

Nurmsi
- Village
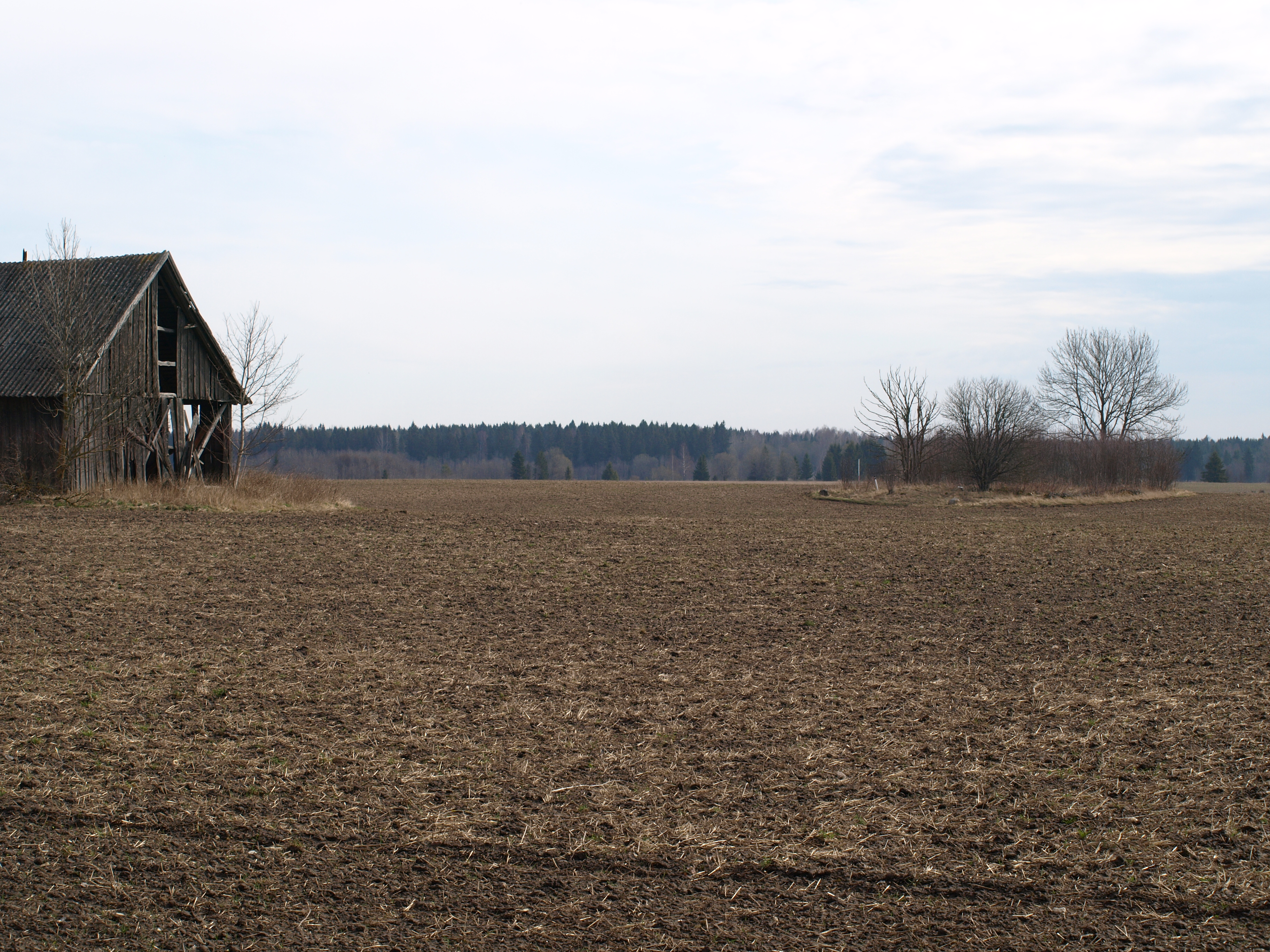
- Field in Nurmsi with Iron Age tarand graves in the distance
- Interactive map of Nurmsi
- Country: Estonia
- County: Järva County
- Municipality: Paide
- Time zone: UTC+2 (EET)
  - Summer (DST): UTC+3 (EEST)

Nurmsi is a village in Paide municipality, Järva County in northern-central Estonia. Prior to the 2017 administrative reform of local governments, it was located in Paide Parish.

Nurmsi Airfield (ICAO: EENI) is located near Nurmsi.
