= Roosna-Alliku Parish =

Former municipality of Estonia

Coordinates: 59.027°N 25.708°E

Roosna-Alliku Parish Roosna-Alliku vald
- Former municipality of Estonia
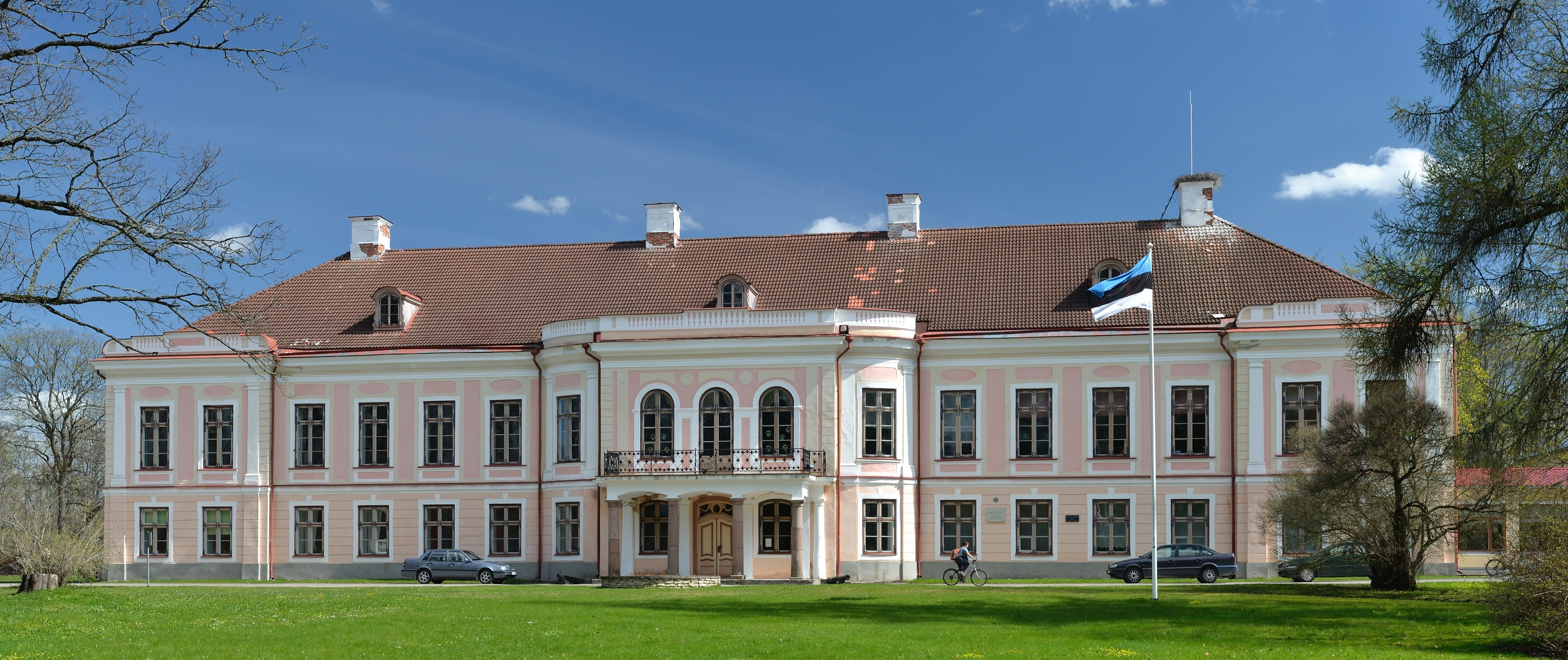
- Roosna-Alliku manor

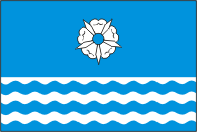
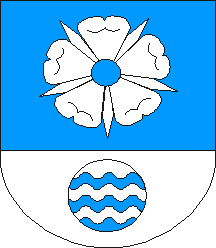
- Flag Coat of arms

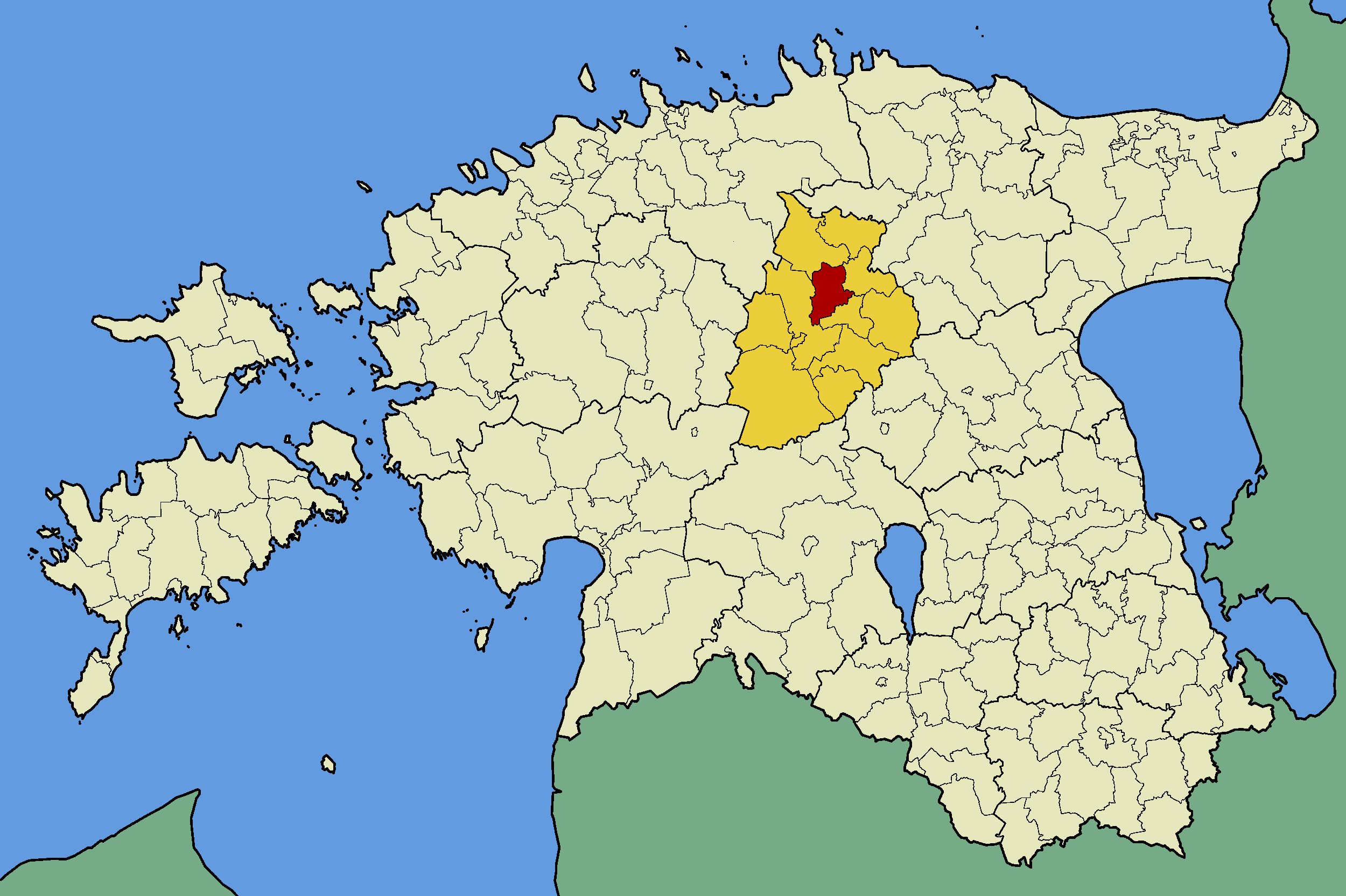
- Roosna-Alliku Parish within Järva County.
- Country: Estonia
- County: Järva County
- Administrative centre: Roosna-Alliku

Area
  - Total: 132 km^{2} (51 sq mi)

Population (2007)
  - Total: 1,238
  - Density: 9.38/km^{2} (24.3/sq mi)
- Website: www.jarva.ee/index.php?page=109

Roosna-Alliku Parish (Estonian: Roosna-Alliku vald) was a rural municipality of Estonia, in Järva County. It had a population of 1238 (as of 2007) and an area of 132 km^{2}.

== Settlements ==
1 small borough: Roosna-Alliku. 12 villages: Allikjärve, Esna, Kaaruka, Kihme, Kirisaare, Kodasema, Koordi, Oeti, Tännapere, Valasti, Vedruka and Viisu.
