= Meelis Rooba =

Estonian footballer and coach

Personal information
- Date of birth: 20 April 1977 (age 49)
- Place of birth: Kaaruka, then part of Estonian SSR, Soviet Union
- Position: Midfielder

Senior career*
Years	Team	Apps	(Gls)
1995	Lelle	22	(1)
1996–1997	Flora	25	(5)
1997–1998	Lelle	12	(3)
1999	Tulevik	23	(5)
2000–2004	Flora	99	(19)
2006–2007	Oper JK	26	(19)
2008–2010	Paide Linnameeskond	53	(8)
Total		260	(60)

International career
1996–2004	Estonia	50	(4)

Managerial career
- 2010–2016: Paide Linnameeskond
- * Club domestic league appearances and goals

Meelis Rooba (born 20 April 1977) is an Estonian professional football coach and former player. He also played for the Estonian national team.

== International career ==
Rooba made his debut for Estonia national football team on 7 July 1996, against Latvia. He made a total of appearances for his country.

== Personal life ==
Rooba is the older brother of former professional footballer Urmas Rooba who made 70 appearances for the Estonia national team between 1996 and 2008.

== Honours ==
Individual

- Meistriliiga Manager of the Month: June 2012, April 2013, April 2016
