= Nurmsi Airfield =

Airfield in Estonia

Nurmsi Airfield Nurmsi lennuväli
- IATA: none; ICAO: ~~EENI~~

Summary
- Airport type: Military
- Operator: ~~Soviet Naval Air Force~~
- Location: Nurmsi
- Elevation AMSL: 72 m / 236 ft
- Coordinates: 58°51′41″N 025°44′06″E

Map
- Location in Estonia

Runways
Direction	Length		Surface
Direction	m	ft	Surface
~~14/32~~	~~2,500~~	~~8,202~~	~~Grass~~
- Sources: Forgotten Airfields

Nurmsi Airfield ~~(ICAO: EENI)~~; (Estonian: Nurmsi lennuväli) (also given as Koigi) was a Soviet Naval Aviation reserve airfield in Estonia located 10 km (6.2 mi) east of Paide in Nurmsi. It was a former attack deployment base and was listed on a 1974 U.S. Department of Defense Global Navigation Chart No. 3 as having jet facilities. At the end of the Cold War the airfield was converted into farmland. Very little of the airfield establishment remains today.
