= Koeru Parish =

Former municipality in Estonia

Coordinates: 58.966667°N 26.033333°E

Koeru Parish Koeru vald
- Municipality of Estonia
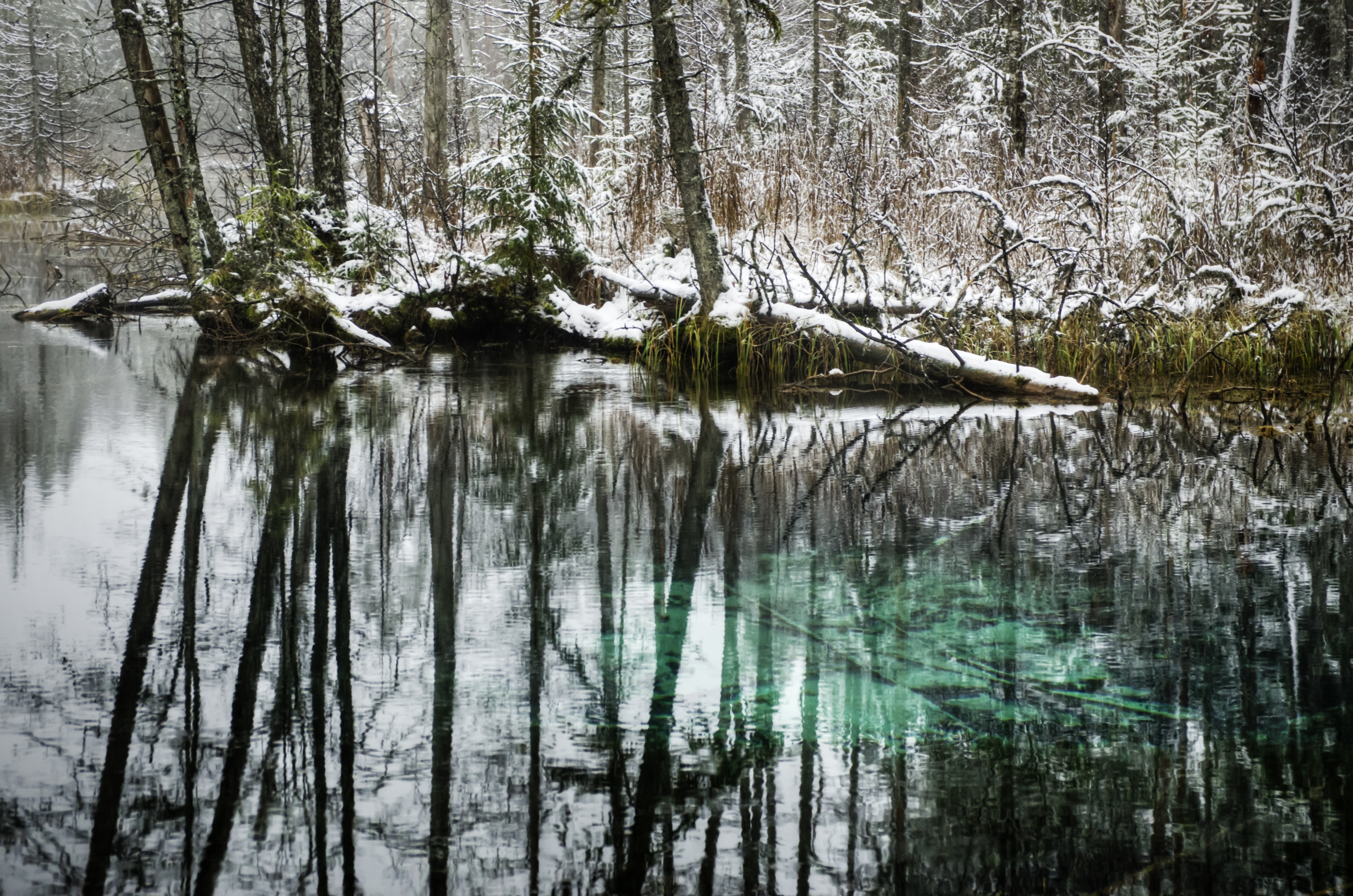
- Blue Springs at Endla Nature Reserve

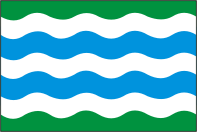
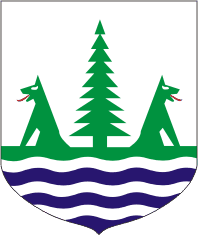
- Flag Coat of arms

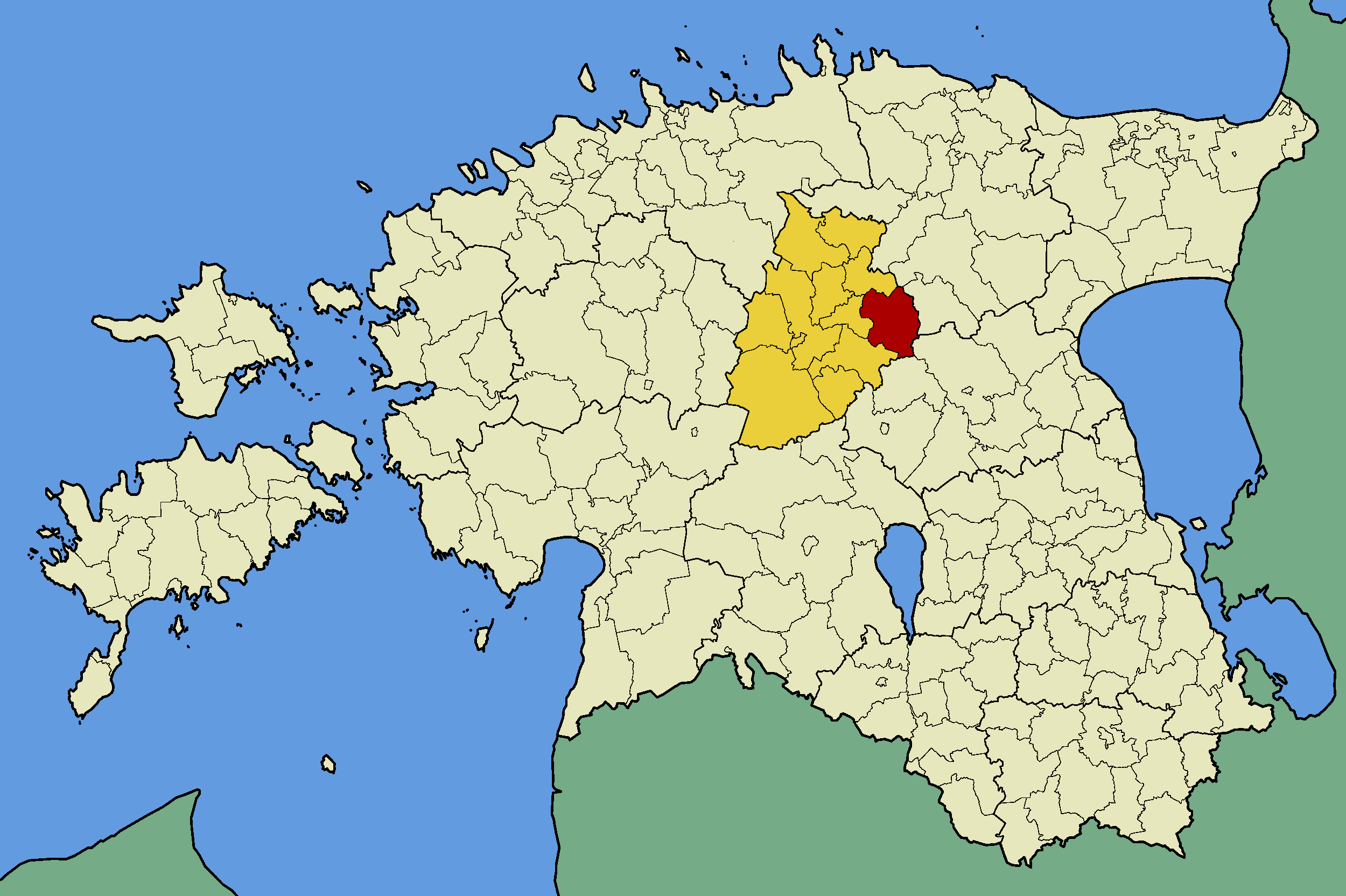
- Koeru Parish within Järva County.
- Country: Estonia
- County: Järva County
- Administrative centre: Koeru

Area
  - Total: 236.82 km^{2} (91.44 sq mi)

Population (2003)
  - Total: 2,465
  - Density: 10.41/km^{2} (26.96/sq mi)
- Website: www.koeruvv.ee

Koeru Parish (Estonian: Koeru vald) was a rural municipality in Järva County, Estonia.

== Settlements ==
1 small borough: Koeru.

26 villages: Abaja, Aruküla, Ervita, Jõeküla, Kalitsa, Kapu, Koidu-Ellavere, Kuusna, Laaneotsa, Liusvere, Merja, Norra, Preedi, Puhmu, Rõhu, Salutaguse, Santovi, Tammiku, Tudre, Udeva, Vahuküla, Väinjärve, Valila, Vao, Visusti and Vuti.

== See also ==
- Koeru TV Mast
- Endla Nature Reserve
