= Koigi Parish =

Former municipality of Estonia

Coordinates: 59.172°N 25.973°E

Koigi Parish Koigi vald
- Municipality of Estonia
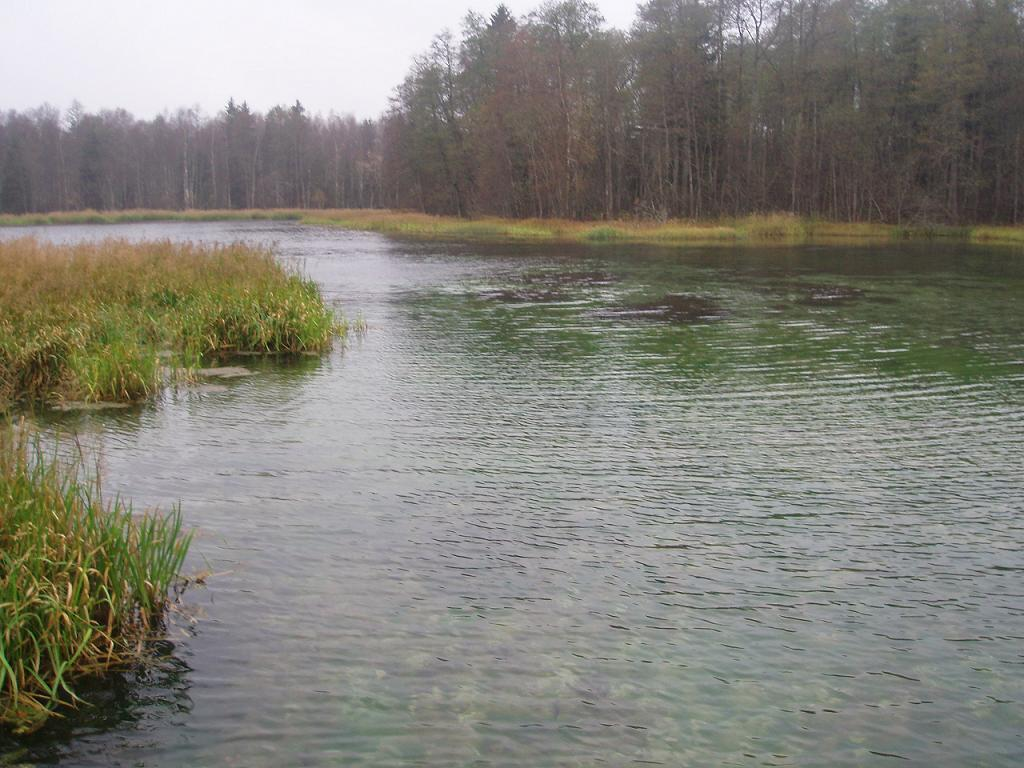

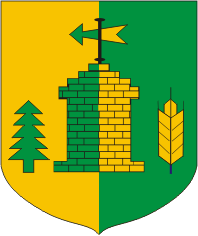
- Flag Coat of arms

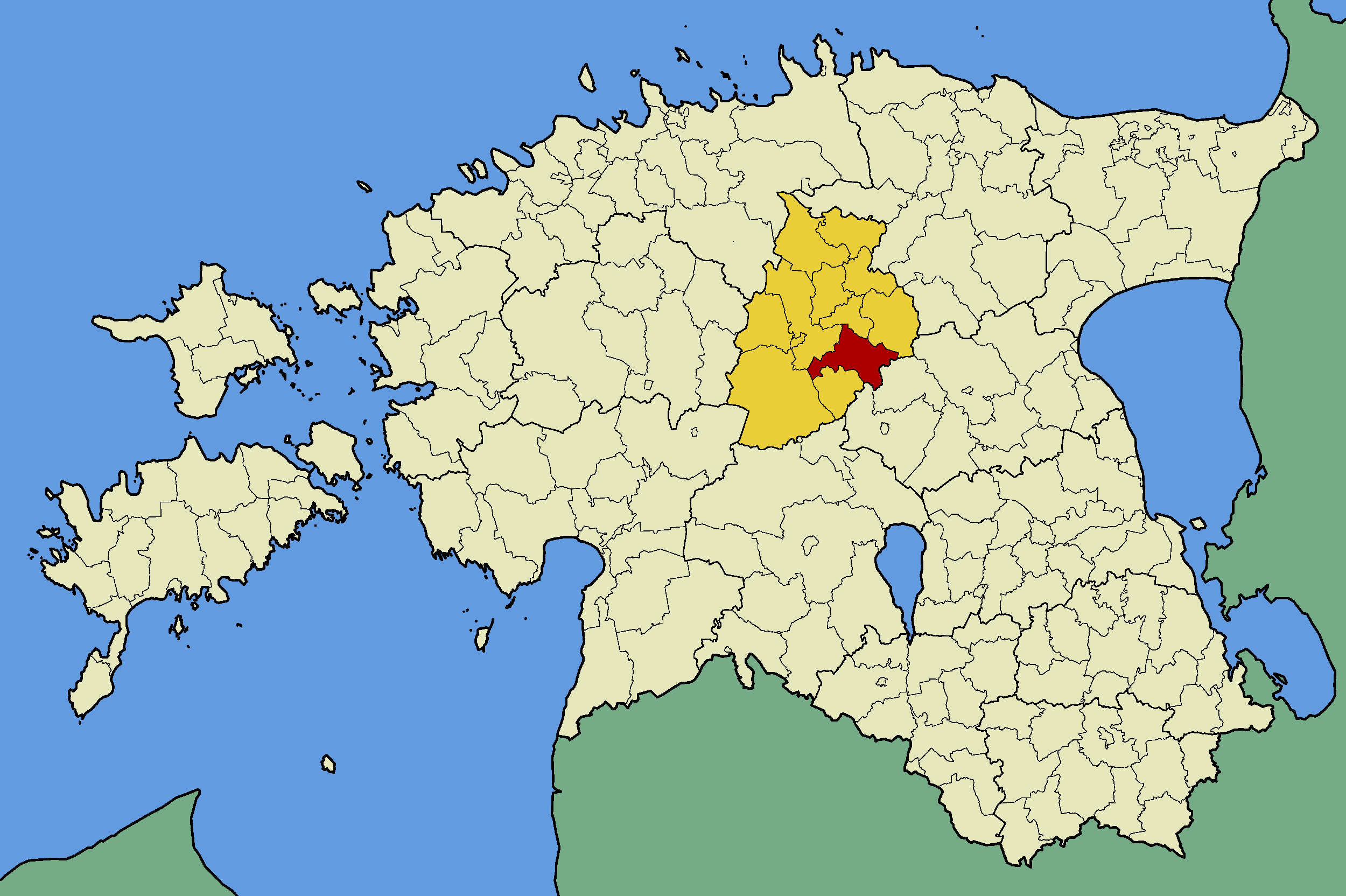
- Koigi Parish within Järva County.
- Country: Estonia
- County: Järva County
- Administrative centre: Koigi

Area
  - Total: 204.45 km^{2} (78.94 sq mi)

Population (2004)
  - Total: 1,177
  - Density: 5.757/km^{2} (14.91/sq mi)
- Website: jarva.ee/index.php?page=113

Koigi (Estonian: Koigi vald) was a rural municipality of Estonia, in Järva County. It had a population of 1,177 (as of 2004) and an area of 204.45 km^{2}.

== Villages ==
Huuksi - Kahala - Keri - Koigi - Lähevere - Prandi - Päinurme - Pätsavere - Rutikvere - Silmsi - Sõrandu - Tamsi - Vaali - Väike-Kareda - Ülejõe.

== See also ==
- Nurmsi Airfield
