= Kareda Parish =

Former municipality of Estonia

Coordinates: 58.963°N 25.801°E

Kareda Parish Kareda vald
- Municipality of Estonia
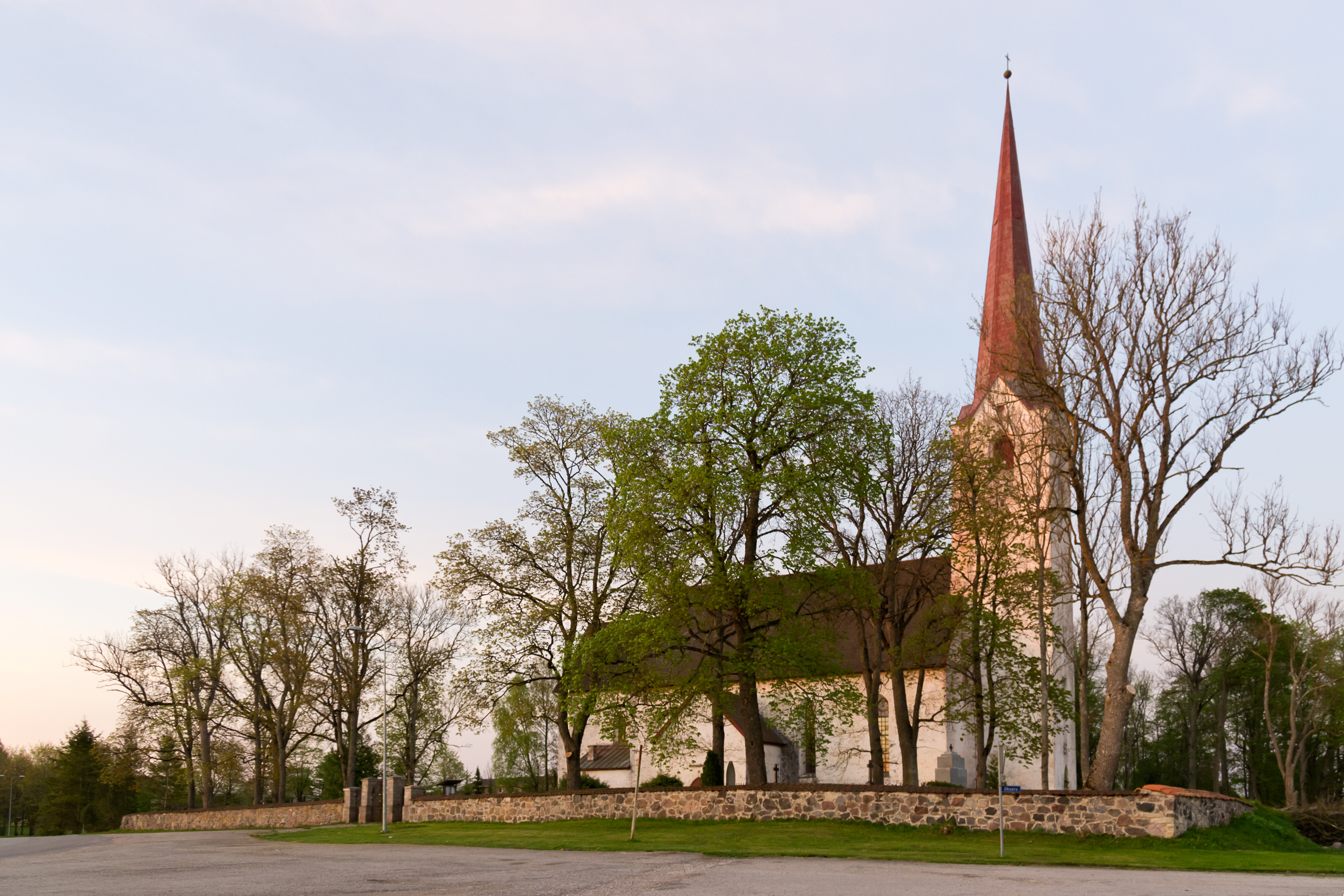
- Järva-Peetri church

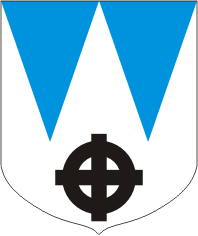
- Flag Coat of arms

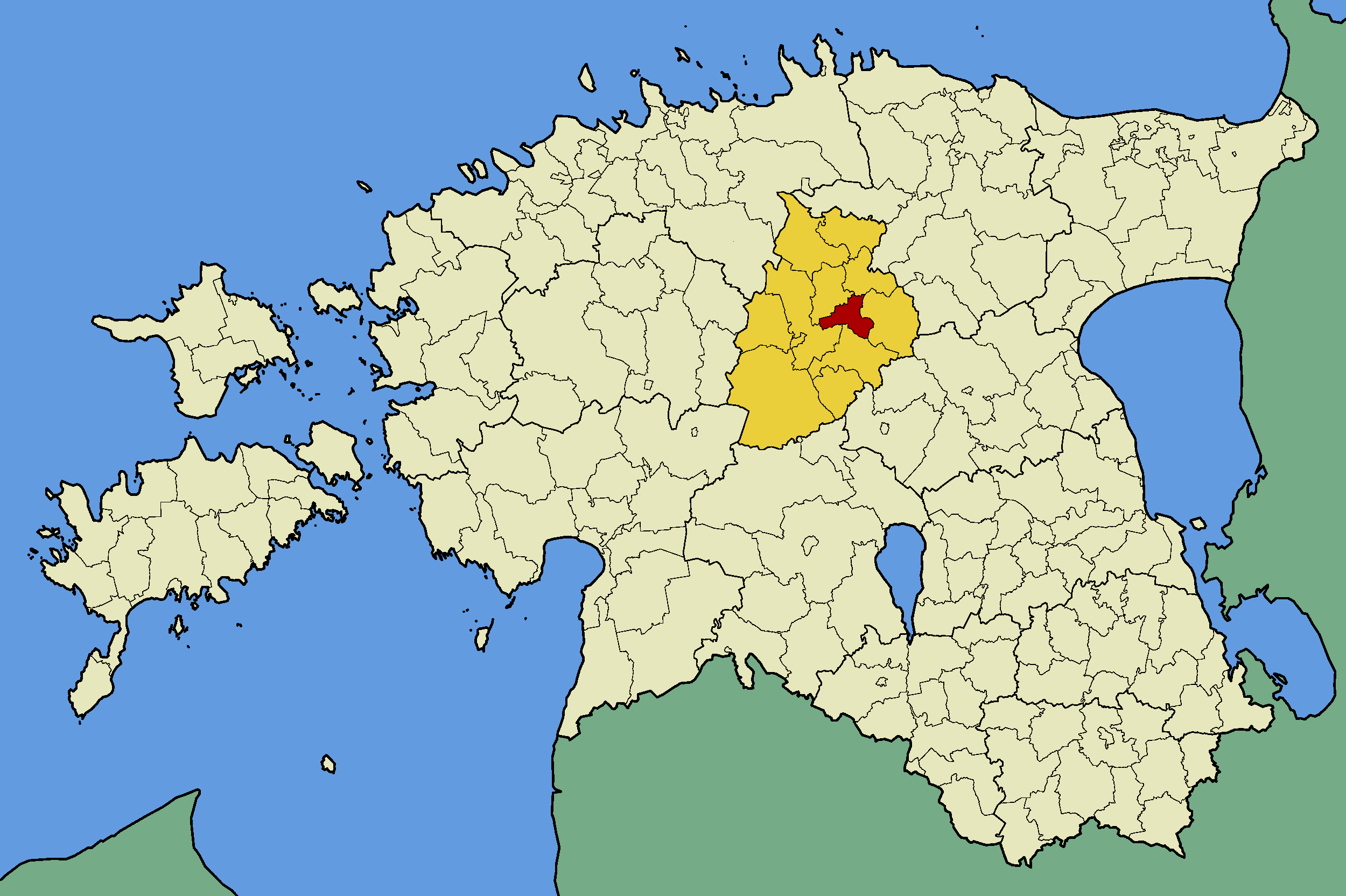
- Kareda Parish within Järva County.
- Country: Estonia
- County: Järva County
- Administrative centre: Peetri

Area
  - Total: 91 km^{2} (35 sq mi)

Population (2006)
  - Total: 846
  - Density: 9.3/km^{2} (24/sq mi)
- Website: www.kareda.ee

Kareda Parish (Estonian: Kareda vald) was a rural municipality of Estonia, in Järva County. It had a population of 846 (2006) and an area of 91 km^{2}.

== Populated places ==
Kareda Parish had a small borough, Peetri, and 11 villages: Ämbra, Ammuta, Ataste, Esna, Kareda, Köisi, Küti, Müüsleri, Õle, Öötla and Vodja.
