= Pätsavere =

Village in Estonia

- Village
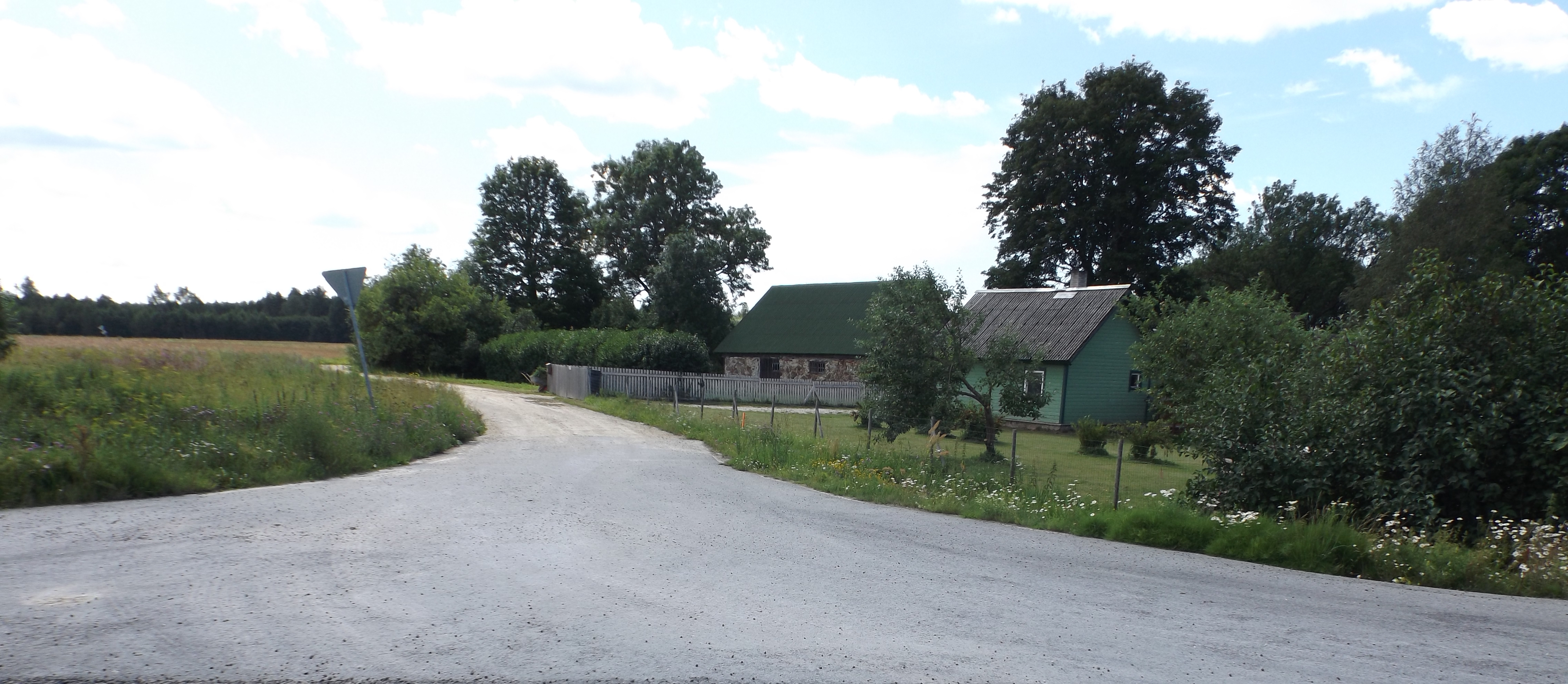

- Location within Estonia
- Coordinates: 58°49′38″N 25°50′11″E
- Country: Estonia
- County: Järva County
- Parish: Järva Parish

Area
  - Total: 2.03 km^{2} (0.78 sq mi)

Population (2014)
  - Total: 2
- Time zone: UTC+2 (EET)
  - Summer (DST): UTC+3 (EEST)

Pätsavere is a village in Järva Parish, Järva County, in central Estonia. Before the administrative reform of the Estonian municipalities of 2017, the village was part of Koigi. The village passes through the Koigi-Päinurme road. In Pätsavere there are three households, two of them with permanent residents. The village was mentioned for the first time in 1782. In 1977, it was annexed by neighboring settlements, but it was once again separated from Huuksi and Lähevere in 2014.
