= Koidu (disambiguation) =

Koidu is a city in Sierra Leone.

Koidu may also refer to one of several villages in Estonia:

- Koidu, Harju County, village in Saue Parish, Harju County
- Koidu, Lääne County, village in Haapsalu, Lääne County
- Koidu, Viljandi County, village in Viljandi Parish, Viljandi County

== See also ==
- Koidu, Saare County, former village in Lääne-Saare Parish, Saare County, now part of Suur-Randvere village
- Koidu-Ellavere, village in Koeru Parish, Järva County, Estonia
