= Jõeküla =

Jõeküla may refer to several places in Estonia:

- Jõeküla, Hiiu County, village in Hiiumaa Parish, Hiiu County
- Jõeküla, Järva Parish, village in Järva Parish, Järva County
- Jõeküla, Türi Parish, village in Türi Parish, Järva County
- Jõeküla, Viljandi County, village in Viljandi Parish, Viljandi County
