= Kuti =

Kuti or Küti may refer to:

== People ==
- Sándor Kuti (1908–1945), Hungarian-Jewish composer
- Ransome-Kuti family, a prominent Nigerian family
- Fela Kuti, musician and prominent figure in Afrobeat music

== Places ==
- Kuti Valley (Byans Gaupalika), a valley in Nepal
- Kuti, Bileća, a village in Bosnia and Herzegovina
- Kuti, Herceg Novi, a village in Montenegro
- Küti, Lääne-Viru County, a village in Vinni Parish, Lääne-Viru County, Estonia
- Küti, Järva County, a village in Järva Parish, Järva County, Estonia
- Kuti (Sokolac), a village in Bosnia and Herzegovina
- Nyalam Town, a Tibetan town formerly known as Kuti
- Nyalam Tong La, a mountain pass in the Himalayas also known as Kuti Pass
- An upper tributary of the Sharda River in Uttarakhand, India
  - Kuthi Valley

== Other uses ==
- Kuti, Ngarrindjeri name for the Australian edible clam Plebidonax deltoides
- KUTI, a radio station licensed to Lacey, Washington, US
- KUTI (Yakima, Washington), a radio station in Yakima, Washington, US
- Coffee-leaf tea, traditional Ethiopian tisane made from steeped coffee leaves
