= Koeru =

Borough in Estonia

Coordinates: 58°58′N 26°02′E

- Small borough
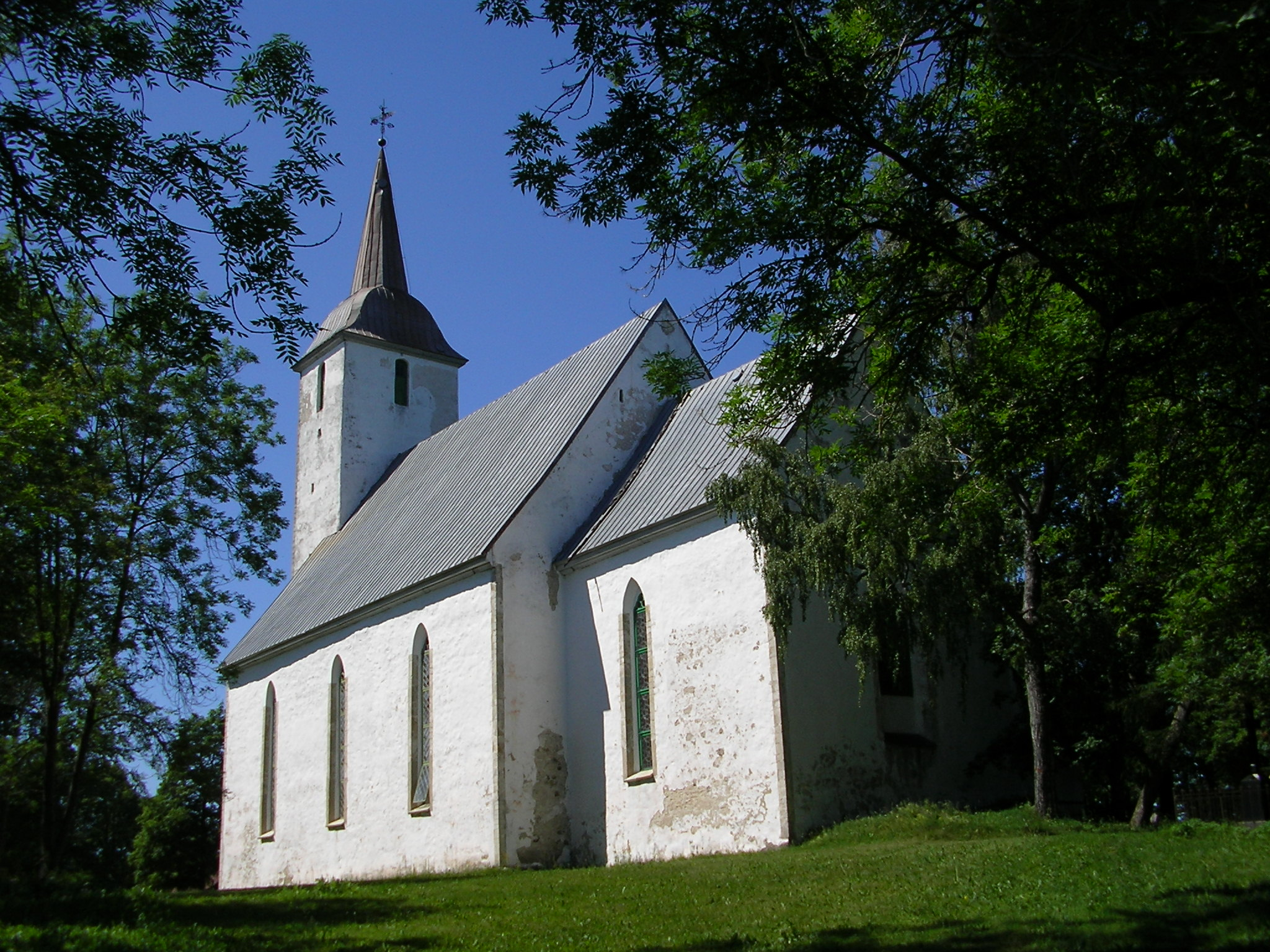
- Koeru Church
- Interactive map of Koeru
- Country: Estonia
- County: Järva County
- Parish: Järva Parish

Population (2011 Census)
  - Total: 1,178
- Time zone: UTC+2 (EET)
  - Summer (DST): UTC+3 (EEST)

Koeru (German: Sankt Marien-Magdalenen) is a small borough in Järva Parish, Järva County in north-central Estonia. As of the 2011 census, the settlement's population was 1,178.

== History ==
Koeru township was first mentioned 1281 and it has been claimed to be part of one of the oldest parishes in Estonia. Between the world wars, Koeru had an active social life as there were choirs, orchestra, sport clubs etc.

After Soviet occupation began and World War II was finished, during collectivization two state farms called Sovkhoz were founded. Koeru Sovkhoz, with center in nearby Vao village and Udeva Sovkhoz, with center in Ervita village. At the Aruküla Mansions former vodka factory premises was built a local Machine tractor station. After Machine tractor station was formally disbanded late 50s, Koeru Car Repair factory, in operation 1959 – 1994, was created at the same premises. Official name of factory was "Koeru Car Repair factory nr 2" (In Estonian: Koeru Autoremonditehas nr 2.) Initial equipment was taken from Machine tractor station and some of the needed equipment was also locally produced. At the beginning, electricity in factory was created by diesel generator produced by MAN, war trophy from Germany, and this remained so until factory was connected to the power grid in 1963. Factory did specialize on passenger cars made by GAZ and most vehicles were either Pobedas´and from 1964 Volgas. Most of vehicles sent for repairs were used as taxis. Factory also produced Flatbeds for Flatbed trucks. In 1970s, with the Car Repair factory built a new kindergarten, school and health center for the local community. 160 flats were also built and priority of the housing went to the factory workers but also to doctors and school teachers serving local community.

After restoration of Estonian independence 1991, factory was sold by Estonian Privatization Agency to a Finnish investor and this turned out to be a bad deal for locals. The new management mishandled the factory and within few years, everything else was sold except the empty buildings. Factory, renamed as "Metallmex", declared bankruptcy in 1996. AS Konesko Eesti bought the premises and restarted the factory for its own needs. It's still in operation in 2026.

== Notable monuments ==
The tallest structure in Estonia, the Koeru TV Mast, is located near Koeru in the village of Kapu.

== Notable people ==
- Aino Bach (1901–1980), artist
- Gert Kams (born 1985), football player
- Kalju Lepik (1920–1999), poet
- Karl Selter (1898–1958), politician
- Lembit Ulfsak (1947–2017), actor
