= Juhan Leinberg =

Estonian religious personnel, founder of Maltsvetian movement

- Born: 26 September 1812; Koeru, Järva County, Governorate of Estonia, Russian Empire
- Died: 28 August 1885 (aged 72); Ambla, Järva County, Governorate of Estonia, Russian Empire
- Other name: Prophet Maltsvet
- Known for: Founder of a religious sect the Maltsvetians in Estonia

Juhan Leinberg (26 September 1812 – 28 August 1885), also known as Prophet Maltsvet, was a founder of a religious sect named after him (the Maltsvetians) in Estonia.

== Biography ==
Juhan Leinberg was born in Norra Parish in Järva County. In his youth he was a farmer, miller, barkeeper, and merchant in Tallinn. In 1854 he started preaching in northern Estonia and called on people to give up collecting wealth. A short imprisonment in 1858 increased his popularity, and the number of his followers reached 200 to 300 families.

In 1860 Leinberg started to promote relocation to Crimea, going there himself in February 1861. The most fanatic of the Maltsvetians waited in May and June 1861 at Lasnamäe for the coming of the "White Ship" that was to take them to the promised land. The followers of Maltsvet also played an important part in the peasant rebellions in Albu and Ahula in November 1861. By the mid-1860s, Maltsvet's influence had worn off. After his return to Estonia in 1865, he resumed his business career. Leinberg died in Pruuna Parish in Järva County.

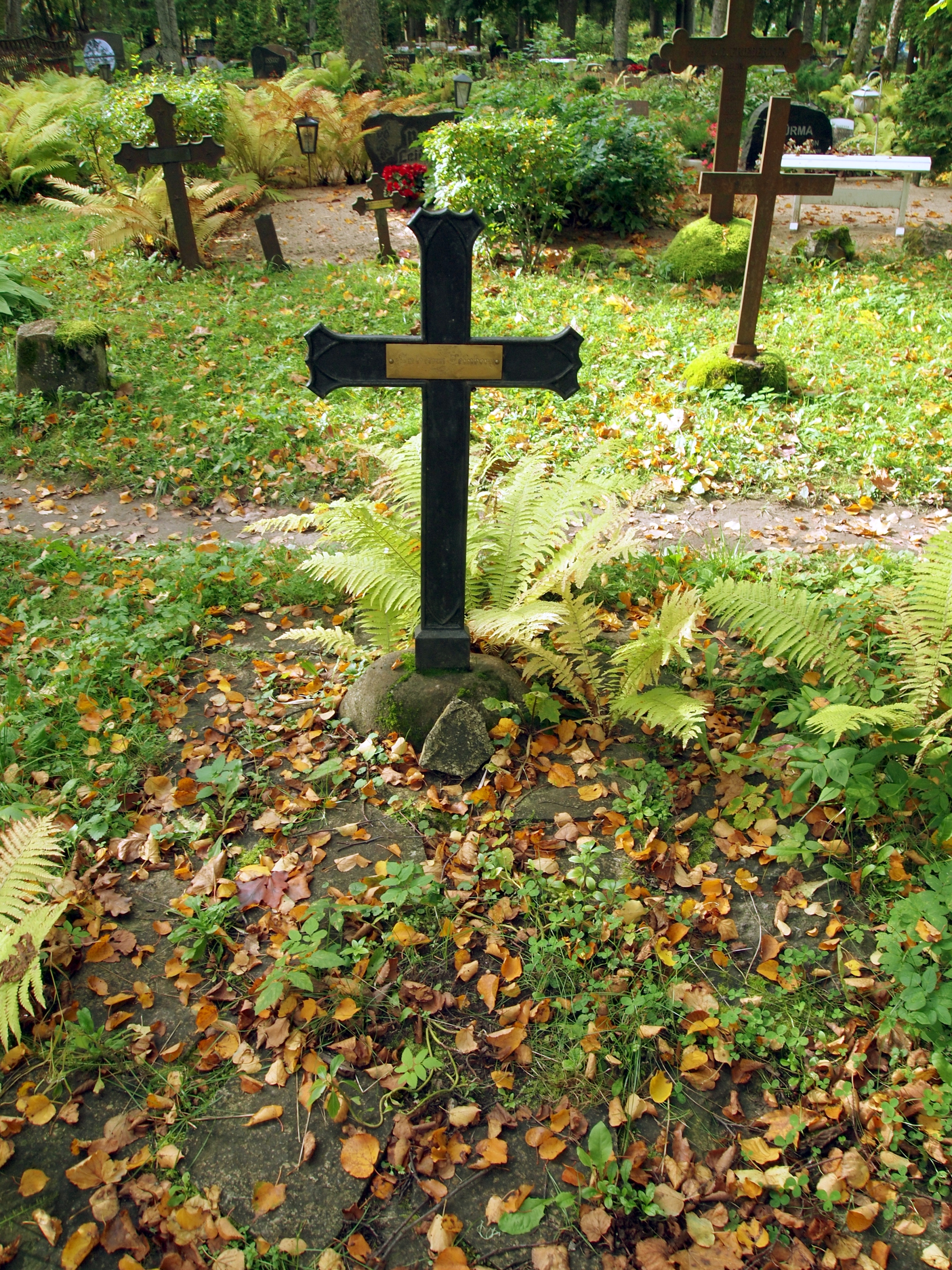
Grave of Juhan Leinberg at Reopalu Cemetery in Paide

The movement of the Maltsvetians is treated by Eduard Vilde (1865–1933) in the novel Prohvet Maltsvet (Prophet Maltsvet). Published in 1908, this was the third book of a trilogy that established Vilde as a writer. Like the others, it mixed fact and fiction, but it was based on letters and notes from interviews with Crimean Estonians.

The Finnish author Aino Kallas wrote the short story "Lasnamäen valkea laiva" (The White Ship of Lasnamäe), which portrays the members of Leinberg's religious sect waiting for a white ship to take them into paradise, as Leinberg had promised according to the story.
