= Tanel Ingi =

Estonian theater and film actor

- Born: 26 November 1976 (age 49); Tallinn, then part of Estonian SSR, Soviet Union
- Occupation: Actor
- Years active: 1996–present
- Children: 2

Tanel Ingi (born 26 November 1976) is an Estonian stage and film actor who performs primarily at the Ugala theatre.

== Early life ==
Tanel Ingi was born in Tallinn. In 1995, he began attending the Kopli-Tallinn Art School. He attended the Viljandi Culture Academy, graduating in 1999. He began appearing in stage roles while still a student.

== Career ==
In 1998, he joined the Ugala theatre in Viljandi, where he still performs at present. He has performed in a variety of stage productions, including works by: William Shakespeare, A. A. Milne, Anton Chekhov, Leo Tolstoy, Robert Louis Stevenson, Mark Twain, August Gailit, Jules Verne, Tom Stoppard, Friedrich Schiller, Victor Hugo and Oskar Luts, among many others.

In addition to his work in the theatre, Ingi has appeared in several film and television roles. He made his film debut in the 1999 Valentin Kuik directed drama Lurjus (English release title: An Affair of Honour), starring Taavi Eelmaa. One of his more notable performances was as Tõnu in the 2005 Ilmar Raag directed ETV television film August 1991; a dramatization of the failed Soviet attempt to suppress the Singing Revolution independence movement in Estonia. He has also appeared on the ETV children's television series Nöbinina, the TV3 series Kättemaksukontor, the Kanal 2 crime series Kelgukoerad and the ETV political satire series Riigimehed. In 2015, he joined the cast of the Kanal 2 television drama series Pilvene all as the character Andres Kroon. In 2017 he joined the cast of the ETV ten-part drama series Pank as the character Aivar, which follows the rise and subsequent misfortunes of a new bank that which emerges in Estonia in the 1990s. In 2020, he co-directed the comedy feature film Asjad, millest me ei räägi with Andrejs Ekis.

== Personal life ==
Tanel Ingi resides in Viljandi with his wife Kätlin. The couple have a summer home in Koeru Parish near the village of Preedi in Järva County.
