= Koigi =

Koigi may refer to different places in Estonia:

- Koigi, Järva County, village in Järva Parish, Järva County
  - Koigi Parish, former municipality in Järva County
  - Koigi (air base) (also Nurmsi Airfield), former soviet air base in Estonia
- Koigi, Rapla County, village in Rapla Parish, Rapla County
- Koigi, Saare County, village in Saaremaa Parish, Saare County
