= Norra =

NORRA or Norra may refer to:

- Nordic Regional Airlines, a Finnish airline operating on behalf of, and formerly majority-owned by, Finnair
- National Off-Road Racing Association, a desert off-road racing association
- Norra, Estonia, village in Estonia
