= Silmsi Nature Reserve =

Protected area in Estonia

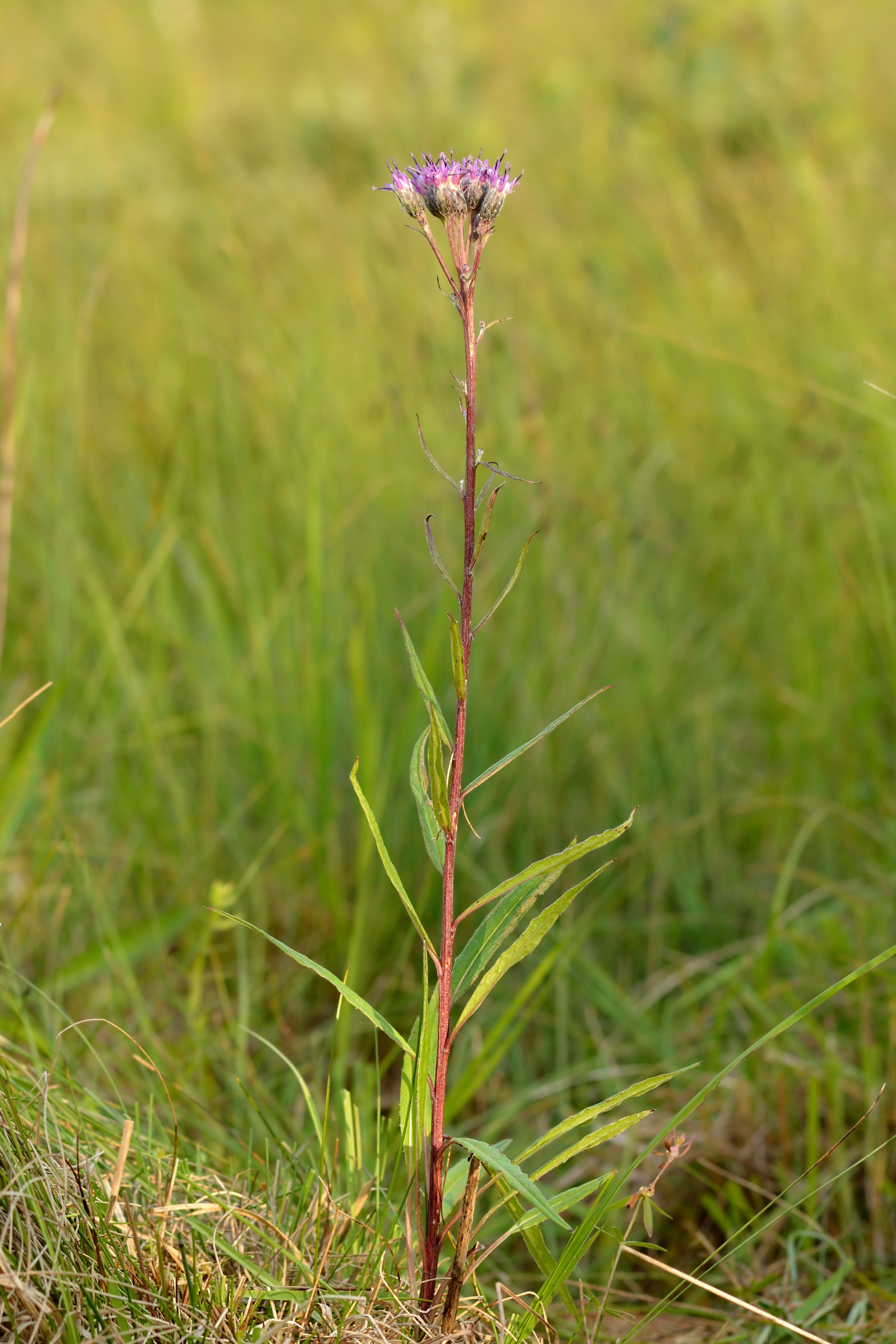
- Saussurea esthonica

- Location within Estonia
- Location: Estonia
- Coordinates: 58°52′30″N 25°56′00″E
- Area: 146 ha (360 acres)
- Established: 2005

Silmsi Nature Reserve is a nature reserve which is located in Järva County, Estonia.

The area of the nature reserve is 146 ha.

The protected area was founded in 2005 to protect valuable habitat types and threatened species in Valila village (former Koeru Parish).
