= Tamsi =

Tamsi may refer to several geographical objects:

- Tamsi mandal, area in India

Estonia

- Tamsi, Järva County, village in Järva Parish, Järva County
- Tamsi, Rapla County, village in Rapla Parish, Rapla County
