= Ammuta =

Ammuta may refer to several places in Estonia:

- Ammuta, Järva County, village in Kareda Parish, Järva County
- Ammuta, Lääne County, village in Ridala Parish, Lääne County
