= Rõhu =

Rõhu may refer to several places in Estonia:

- Rõhu, Tartu County, a village
- Rõhu, Järva County, a village

== See also ==
- Rohu, a species of fish of the carp family found in rivers in South Asia
- Rohu, Estonia, a village in Vinni Parish, Lääne-Viru Count
