= Abaja =

Abaja may refer to several places in Estonia:

- Abaja, Järva County, village in Koeru Parish, Järva County
- Abaja, Saare County, village in Kihelkonna Parish, Saare County
