= Salutaguse =

Salutaguse may refer to several places in Estonia:

- Salutaguse, Järva County, village in Järva Parish, Järva County
- Salutaguse, Lääne-Viru County, village in Vinni Parish, Lääne-Viru County
- Salutaguse, Rapla County, village in Kohila Parish, Rapla County
