= Õle =

Village in Estonia

Coordinates: 58°59′00″N 25°49′30″E

- Village
- Interactive map of Õle
- Country: Estonia
- County: Järva County
- Parish: Järva Parish
- Time zone: UTC+2 (EET)
  - Summer (DST): UTC+3 (EEST)

Õle is a village in Järva Parish, Järva County in northern-central Estonia.
