= Väike-Kareda =

Village in Estonia

Coordinates: 58°53′N 25°48′E

- Village
- Interactive map of Väike-Kareda
- Country: Estonia
- County: Järva County
- Parish: Järva Parish
- Time zone: UTC+2 (EET)
  - Summer (DST): UTC+3 (EEST)

Väike-Kareda (German: Essensberg) is a village in Järva Parish, Järva County in northern-central Estonia.
