= Vodja =

Village in Estonia

Coordinates: 58°56′N 25°41′E

- Village
- Interactive map of Vodja
- Country: Estonia
- County: Järva County
- Parish: Järva Parish
- Time zone: UTC+2 (EET)
  - Summer (DST): UTC+3 (EEST)

Vodja (German: Wodja) is a village in Järva Parish, Järva County in north-central Estonia.
