= August 1991 (film) =

2005 film directed by Ilmar Raag

- Genre: Dramatization
- Written by: Ilmar Raag
- Directed by: Ilmar Raag
- Starring: Tanel Ingi, Hilje Murel, Andres Mähar
- Country of origin: Estonia
- Original language: Estonian

Production
- Producers: Andres Arro, Gerda Kordemets
- Cinematography: Janno Hans-Arro
- Editor: Tambet Tasuja
- Budget: €50,000 (est.)

Original release
- Release: February 24, 2005

August 1991 is a 2005 television dramatization of a failed Soviet attempt to suppress the Singing Revolution independence movement in Estonia. At the same time as the events unfold in Estonia, a 1991 Soviet coup d'état attempt is taking place in Moscow. Tanks roll through the streets of Estonia, attempting to crush the fledgling democracy and assert Soviet authority. Written and directed by Ilmar Raag for Estonian Television, the film focuses on the role of a newly defiant and independent Estonian media. In spite of a low budget and sometimes wooden acting, the film is seen as an effective, moving portrayal of Estonian independence.

== Cast ==
- Tanel Ingi as Tõnu
- Hilje Murel as Anu
- Andres Mähar as Paul
- Hele Kõre as Anneli
- Tõnu Oja as Aare
- Peeter Tammearu as Mart Siimann
- Andres Noormets as Hagi Shein
- Hendrik Toompere Jr. as Andres Raid
- Gert Raudsep as Tiit Kimmel
- Tiina Mälberg as Virve Liivanõmm
- Rain Simmul as Heimar Lenk
- Tiit Palu as Enn Eesmaa
- Hans Kaldoja as Aivo Barbo
- Aksel Lemberg as Endel Sõerde
- Indrek Taalmaa as Carl Danhammer
