= Visusti, Järva County =

Village in Estonia

Coordinates: 58°58′49″N 25°59′12″E

Visusti
- Village
- Interactive map of Visusti
- Country: Estonia
- County: Järva County
- Parish: Järva Parish
- Time zone: UTC+2 (EET)
  - Summer (DST): UTC+3 (EEST)

Visusti is a village in Järva Parish, Järva County in northern-central Estonia.
