= Väinjärve =

Village in Estonia

Coordinates: 58°57′N 26°05′E

- Village
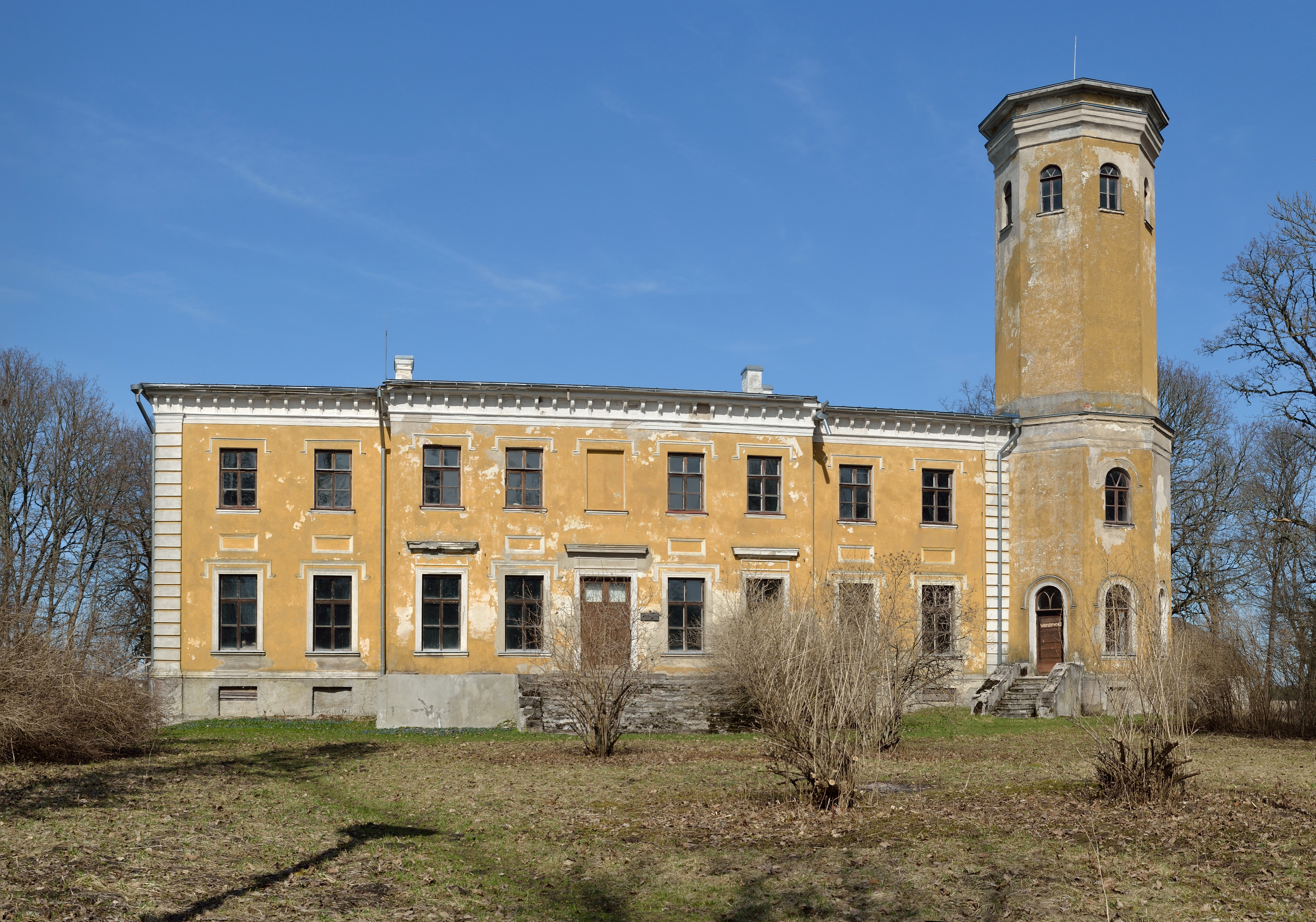
- Väinjärve manor
- Interactive map of Väinjärve
- Country: Estonia
- County: Järva County
- Parish: Järva Parish
- Time zone: UTC+2 (EET)
  - Summer (DST): UTC+3 (EEST)

Väinjärve (German: Weinjerwen) is a village in Järva Parish, Järva County in north-central Estonia.

General Hugo Kauler (1893–1942) was born in Väinjärve.

== Väinjärve manor ==
Väinjärve estate was established after 1663. The current building is from the 1860s and built in a historicist style with an eight-sided tower.

Johann von Michelsohnen, the first Russian General of Estonian descent, was born on the estate in 1735.
