= Reopalu Cemetery =

Cemetery in Estonia

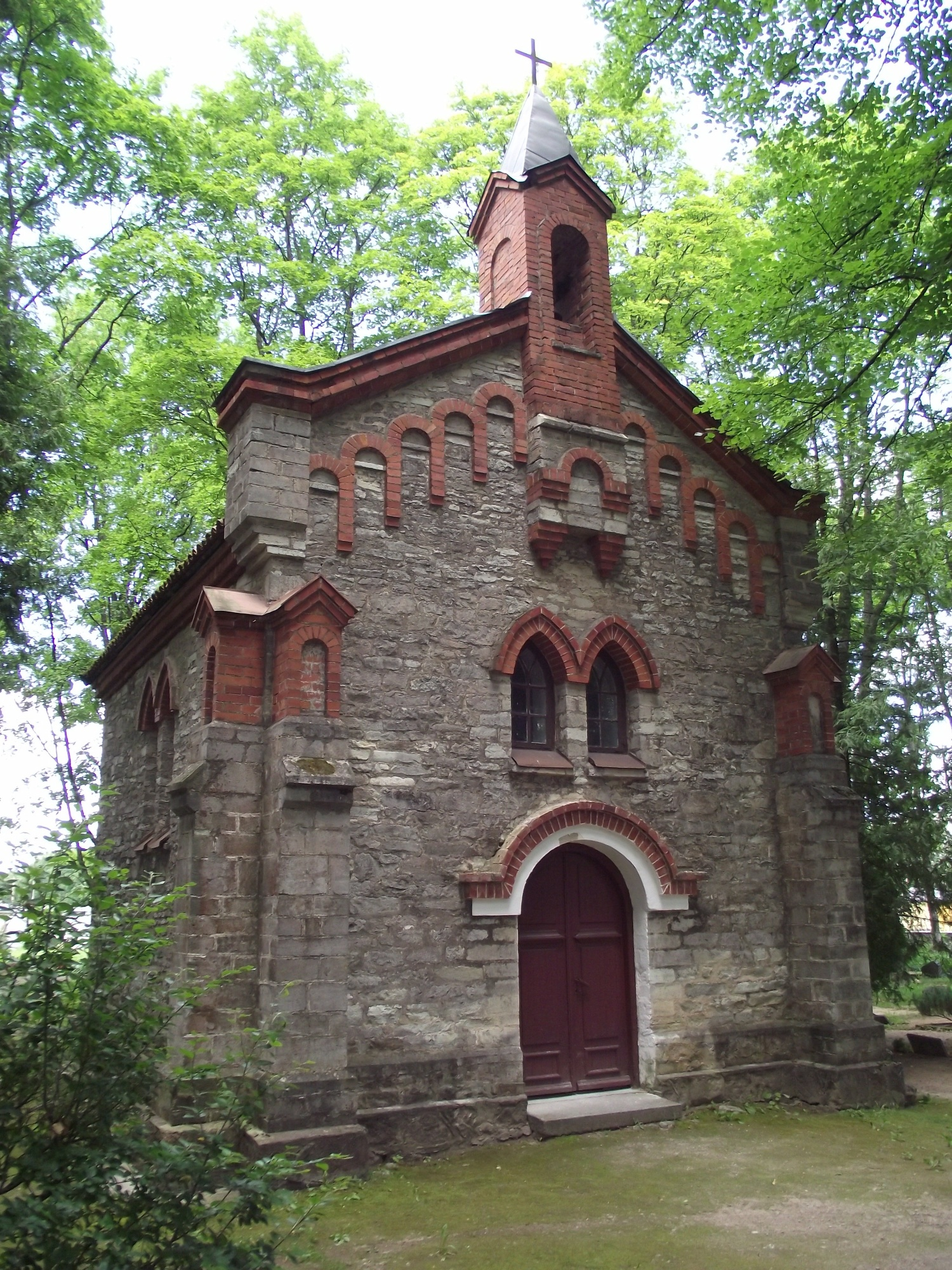
- Cemetery's chapel
- Interactive map of Reopalu Cemetery

Details
- Established: 1774
- Location: Paide
- Country: Estonia
- Coordinates: 58°52′56″N 25°32′10″E
- Find a Grave: Reopalu Cemetery

Reopalu Cemetery (Estonian: Reopalu kalmistu) is a cemetery in Paide, Estonia.

The cemetery was established in 1774.

== Notable burials ==
- August Wilhelm Hupel, Baltic German publicist, estophile and linguist
- Juhan Leinberg (prophet Maltsvet), Estonian religious leader
