= Koeru TV Mast =

Television tower in Estonia

Coordinates: 58°58′29″N 26°3′23″E

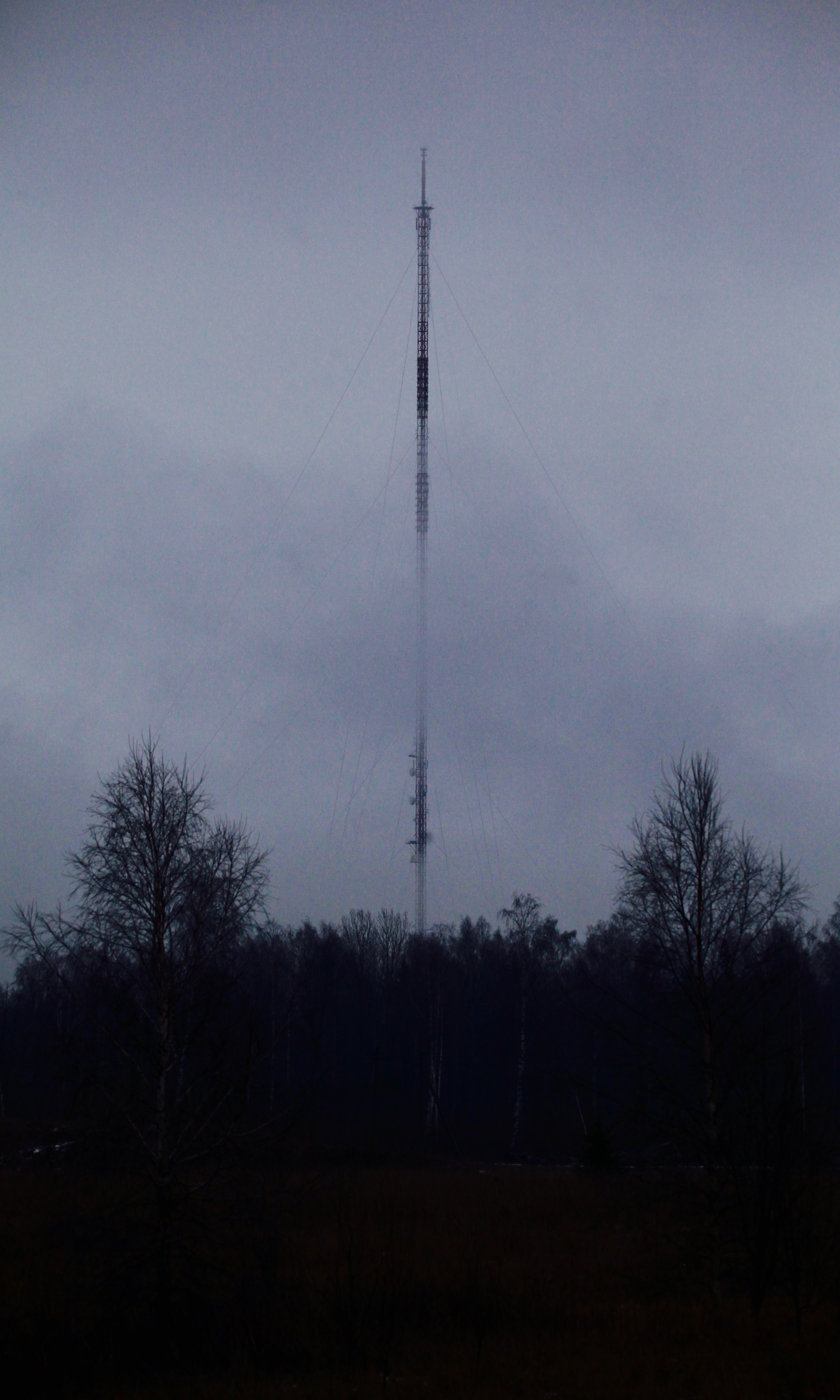
Koeru TV Mast in 2020.

The Koeru TV Mast (Estonian: Koeru telemast) is a 349 metres (1,145 ft) high with the TV mast base sitting at 105 meters high guyed mast in Central Estonia. It is located in Kapu village northwest of Koeru small borough in Järva Parish, Järva County. The TV mast project was finished in 1987 and was built between 1989-1993 and was constructed by Sevzapstalkonstruktsija Leningrad assembly government number 26.

Koeru TV Mast is the tallest structure in Estonia. It is used for FM and TV broadcasting.
