= Tammiku, Järva County =

Village in Estonia

Coordinates: 58°56′46″N 25°53′33″E

Tammiku
- Village
- Interactive map of Tammiku
- Country: Estonia
- County: Järva County
- Parish: Järva Parish
- Time zone: UTC+2 (EET)
  - Summer (DST): UTC+3 (EEST)

Tammiku is a village in Järva Parish, Järva County in northern-central Estonia.

== Name ==
Tammiku was mentioned in written records as Tamiko in 1686 and Tammick in 1726. The name (in the genitive case) comes from the common noun tammik 'oak forest', referring to the local vegetation in the past—already in 1687 only birch, alder, and pine were found in the forests of Ervita Manor, which the village belonged to until 1851.
