= Silmsi, Järva County =

Village in Estonia

Coordinates: 58°52′22″N 25°52′14″E

Silmsi
- Village
- Interactive map of Silmsi
- Country: Estonia
- County: Järva County
- Parish: Järva Parish
- Time zone: UTC+2 (EET)
  - Summer (DST): UTC+3 (EEST)

Silmsi (German: Silms) is a village in Järva Parish, Järva County in northern Estonia.
