= Müüsleri =

Village in Estonia

Coordinates: 58°55′N 25°54′E

- Village
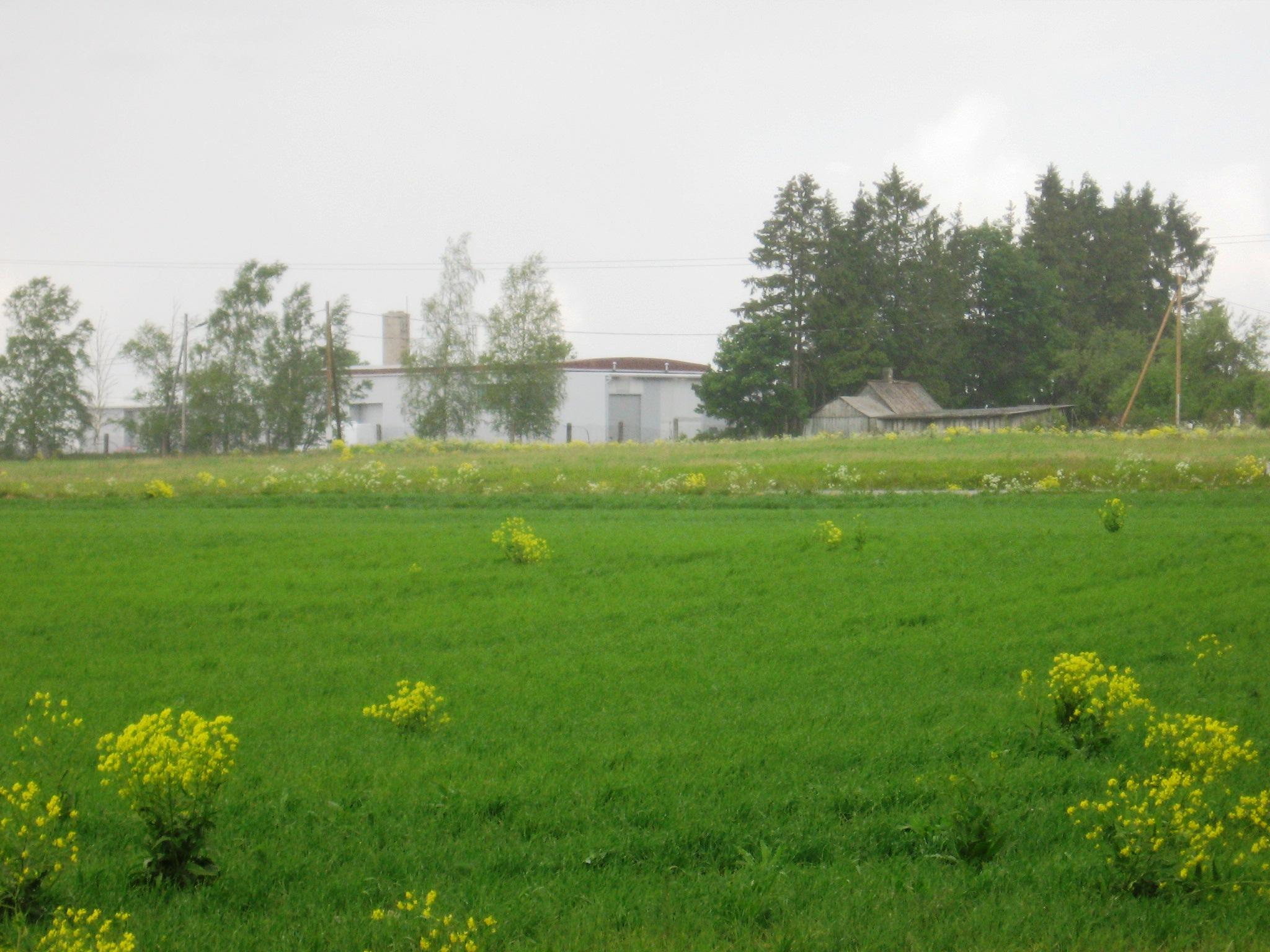
- Interactive map of Müüsleri
- Country: Estonia
- County: Järva County
- Parish: Järva Parish
- Time zone: UTC+2 (EET)
  - Summer (DST): UTC+3 (EEST)

Müüsleri (German: Seinigal) is a village in Järva Parish, Järva County in northern-central Estonia.

== Population ==
Year	Residents
2018	74
2019	82
2020	92
2021	90
2022	89
2023	90
2024	81
2025	65
