= Puhmu =

Village in Estonia

Coordinates: 59°00′N 26°05′E

- Village
- Interactive map of Puhmu
- Country: Estonia
- County: Järva County
- Parish: Järva Parish
- Time zone: UTC+2 (EET)
  - Summer (DST): UTC+3 (EEST)

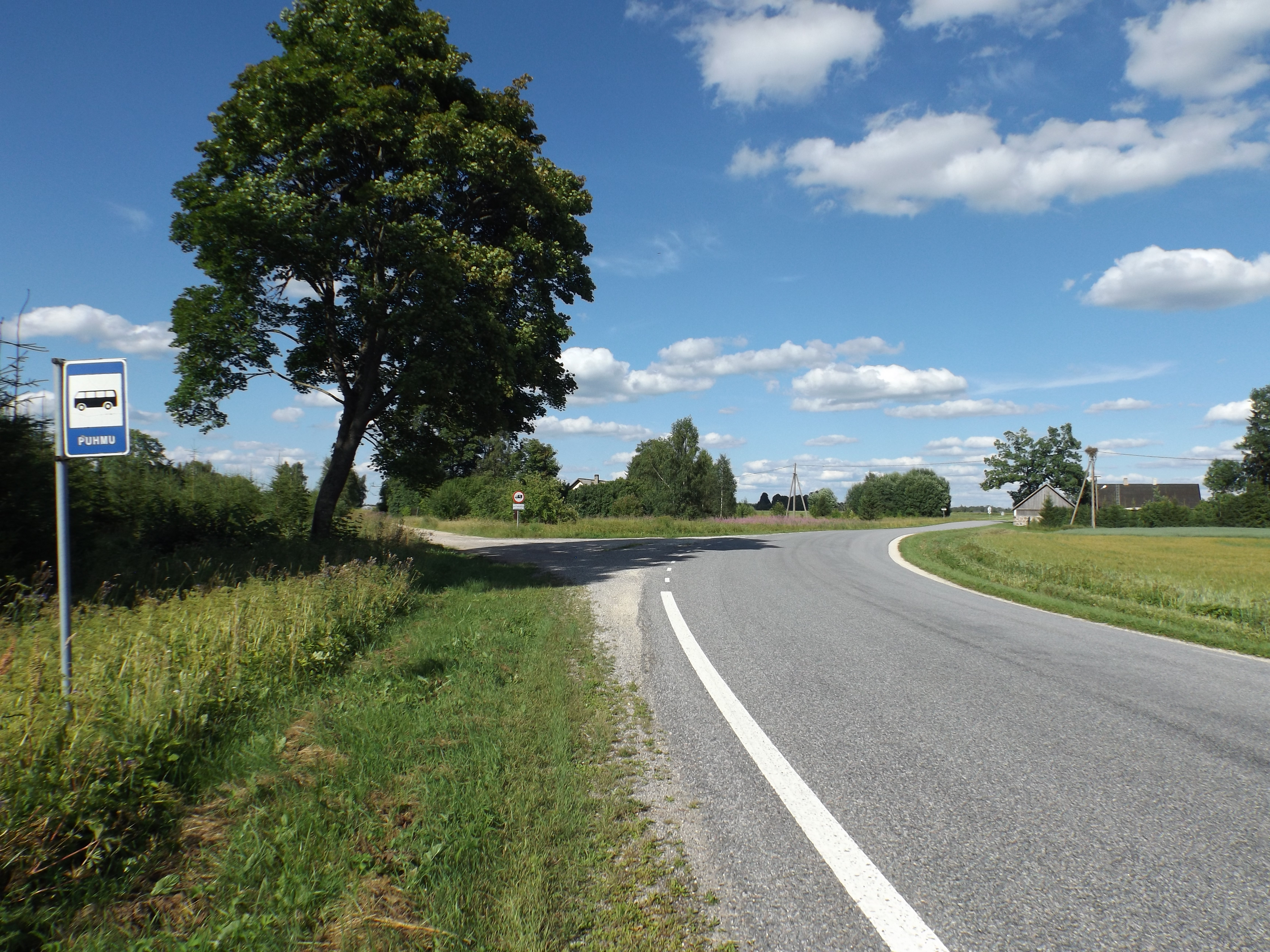
Bus stop in Puhmu village, along the Kapu-Rakke-Paasvere road.

Puhmu is a village in Järva Parish, Järva County in northern-central Estonia.
