= Tudre =

Village in Estonia

Coordinates: 58°58′N 25°56′E

- Village
- Tudre in spring
- Interactive map of Tudre
- Country: Estonia
- County: Järva County
- Parish: Järva Parish
- Time zone: UTC+2 (EET)
  - Summer (DST): UTC+3 (EEST)

Tudre is a village in Järva Parish, Järva County in northern-central Estonia.
