= Prandi, Estonia =

Village in Estonia

Coordinates: 58°50′N 25°44′E

Prandi
- Village
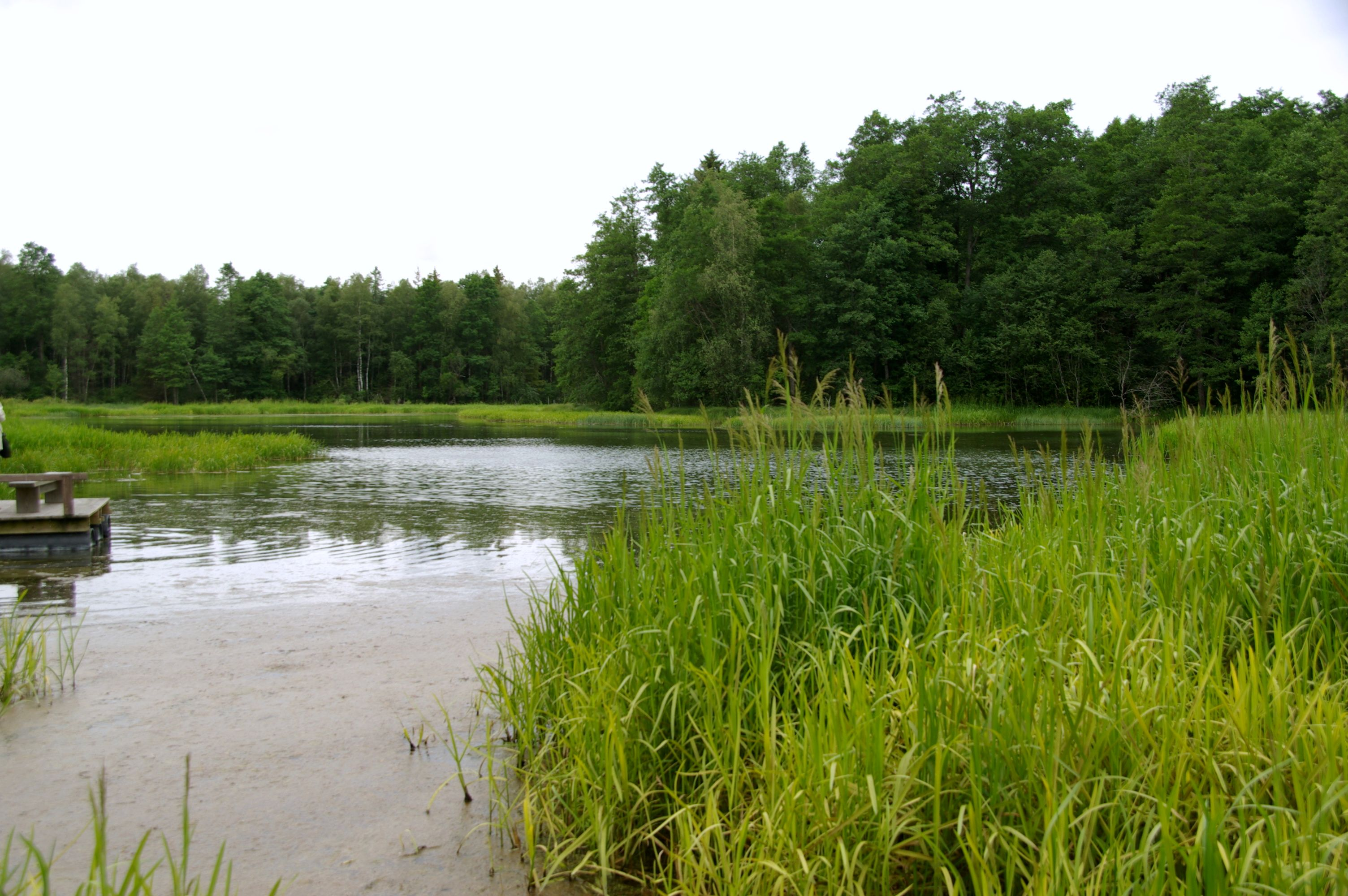
- Prandi tó
- Interactive map of Prandi
- Country: Estonia
- County: Järva County
- Parish: Järva Parish
- Time zone: UTC+2 (EET)
  - Summer (DST): UTC+3 (EEST)

Prandi (German: Brandten) is a village in Järva Parish, Järva County in northern-central Estonia.
