= Rutikvere =

Village in Estonia

Coordinates: 58°47′N 25°56′E

- Village
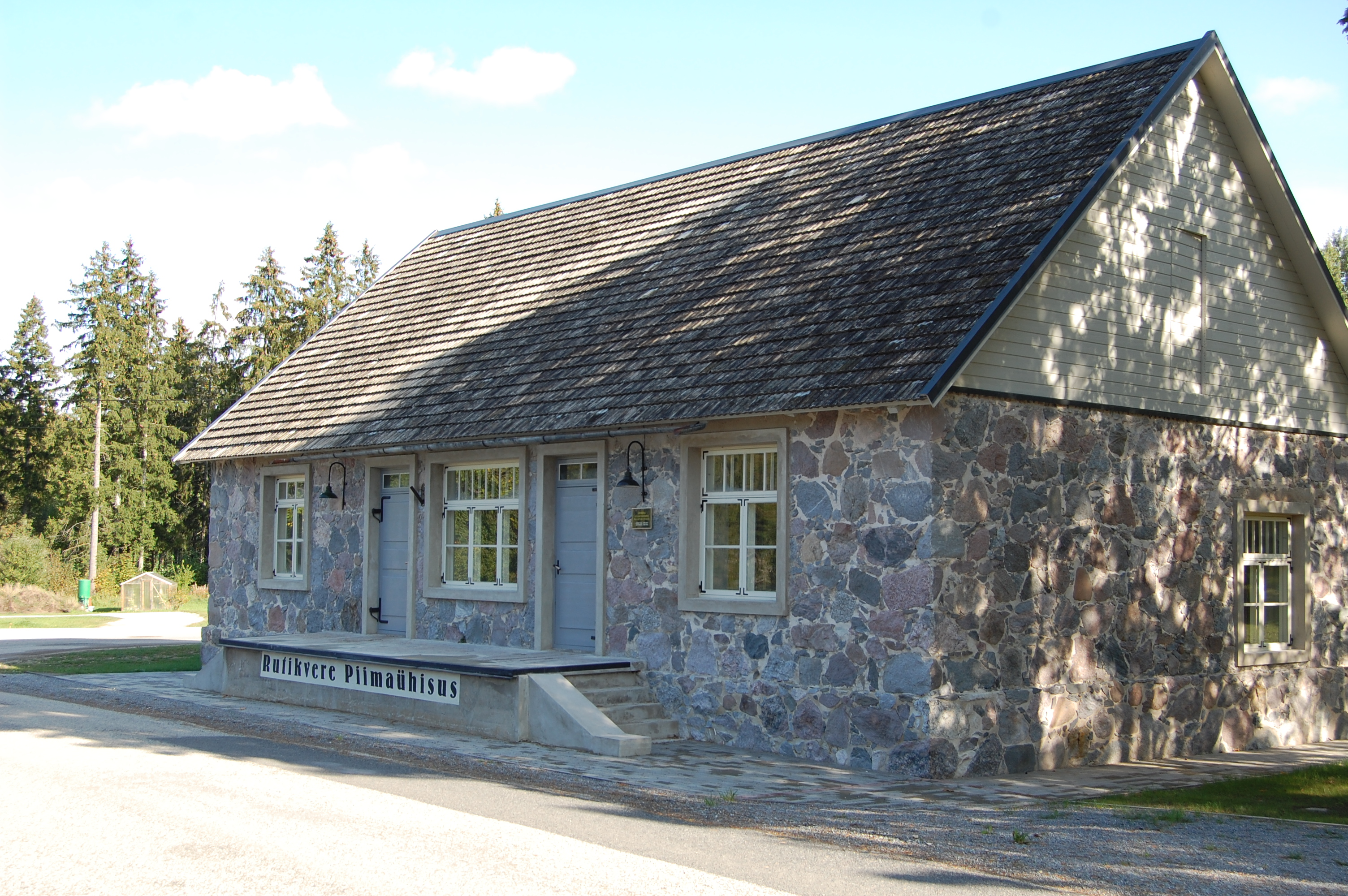
- Rutikvere dairy
- Interactive map of Rutikvere
- Country: Estonia
- County: Järva County
- Parish: Järva Parish
- Time zone: UTC+2 (EET)
  - Summer (DST): UTC+3 (EEST)

Rutikvere (German: Ruttigfer) is a village in Järva Parish, Järva County in northern-central Estonia.
