= Evald Okas =

Estonian painter

- Born: 28 November 1915; Reval, Governorate of Estonia, Russian Empire (now, Tallinn, Estonia)
- Died: 30 April 2011 (aged 95); Tallinn, Estonia
- Education: State School of Art and Design
- Notable work: Giovannina (1957); Akt linna taustal (1957)
- Spouse: Mari Roosvalt
- Children: Kai Koppel, Jüri Okas

Evald Okas (28 November 1915 – 30 April 2011) was an Estonian painter, probably best known for his portraits of nudes.

== Biography ==
Okas was born in Tallinn, where he began his artistic career while studying at the State Art School. With the advent of World War II and the Soviet invasion and occupation of Estonia, he was subsequently mobilized into Soviet army, but, like many other Estonians, moved to work battalions in Kotlas, Russia. When the Soviet officials decided to organize the artistic collectives in the Soviet rear in Yaroslavl, several Estonian artists, including Okas, were provided with an opportunity to leave the work battalions and join the artistic ensembles in 1942. The "Yaroslavl artists", as they came to be known, were also the founding members of the Soviet Estonian Artists Union established in 1943.

In Yaroslavl Okas befriended the rather well-known Estonian graphic artist Aino Bach and Richard Sagrits, who mentored Okas and helped him hone his skills as an artist. By Soviet regulations, however, all artists were expected to paint in the socialist realism genre.

In 1947, Okas, with Elmar Kits and Richard Sagrits painted the ceiling of the Estonian National Opera in the style of socialist realism. By the late 1950s, Evald Okas was working mainly in the medium of charcoals and earning his living by sketching ex libris - graphic designs that identify the owner of a book, usually pasted onto the inside cover. Around this time Okas was even given permission to travel; first, within the Soviet Republics, then later worldwide and exhibit works as far afield as Asia and Western Europe.

In 1954 he became the professor at the Estonian State Art Institute; in 1962 the corresponding member of the Academy of Arts of the Soviet Union and the full member of the academy in 1975.

Evald Okas lived in Tallinn and was a member of the Estonian Artists’ Association.

His son Jüri Okas is an architect, installation artist and printmaker.

== References/External links ==
- Haus Galerii Biography
