= Vaali, Estonia =

Village in Estonia

Coordinates: 58°51′N 25°58′E

Vaali
- Village
- Interactive map of Vaali
- Country: Estonia
- County: Järva County
- Parish: Järva Parish
- Time zone: UTC+2 (EET)
  - Summer (DST): UTC+3 (EEST)

Vaali (German: Wahlhof) is a village in Järva Parish, Järva County in northern-central Estonia.
