= Vuti, Estonia =

Village in Estonia

Vuti
- Village
- Location within Estonia
- Coordinates: 58°58′36″N 25°57′47″E
- Country: Estonia
- County: Järva County
- Parish: Järva Parish
- Time zone: UTC+2 (EET)
  - Summer (DST): UTC+3 (EEST)

Vuti is a village in Järva Parish, Järva County in northern-central Estonia.
