= Vahuküla =

Village in Estonia

Coordinates: 58°59′N 26°05′E

- Village
- Interactive map of Vahuküla
- Country: Estonia
- County: Järva County
- Parish: Järva Parish
- Time zone: UTC+2 (EET)
  - Summer (DST): UTC+3 (EEST)

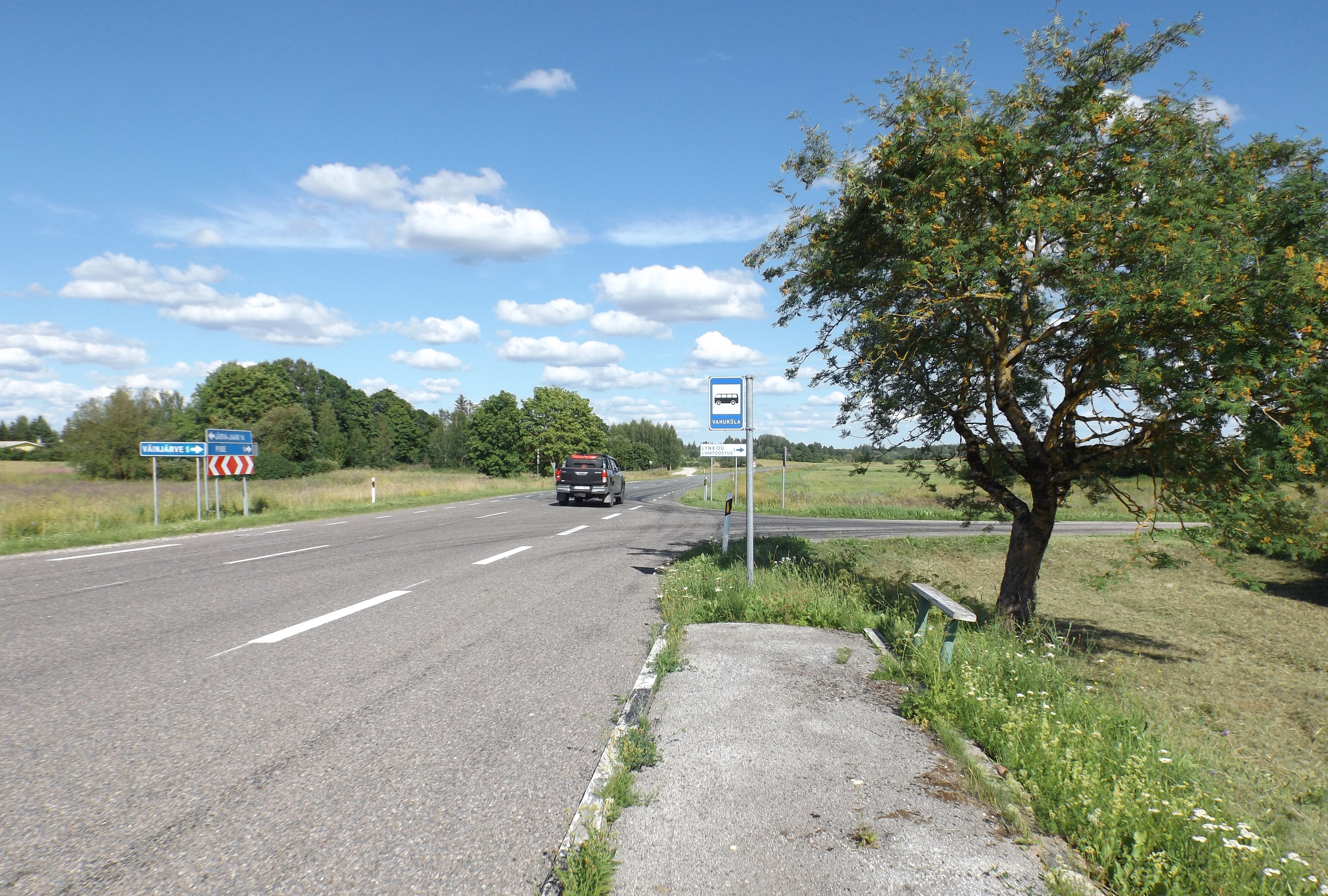
Bus stop in Vahuküla on the Tartu-Jõgeva-Aravete road

Vahuküla is a village in Järva Parish, Järva County in northern-central Estonia.
