= Laaneotsa =

Village in Estonia

Coordinates: 58°58′17″N 26°00′43″E

- Village
- Interactive map of Laaneotsa
- Country: Estonia
- County: Järva County
- Parish: Järva Parish
- Time zone: UTC+2 (EET)
  - Summer (DST): UTC+3 (EEST)

Laaneotsa is a village in Järva Parish, Järva County in northern-central Estonia.
