= Koigi, Järva County =

Village in Estonia

Coordinates: 58°50′07″N 25°45′13″E

Koigi
- Village
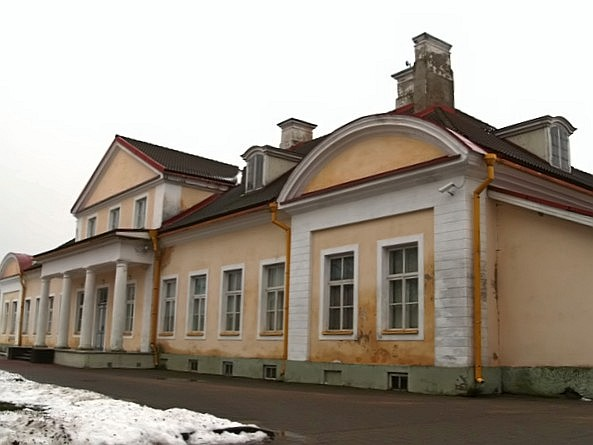
- Koigi Manor
- Interactive map of Koigi
- Country: Estonia
- County: Järva County
- Parish: Järva Parish
- Time zone: UTC+2 (EET)
  - Summer (DST): UTC+3 (EEST)

Koigi (German: Koik) is a village in Järva Parish, Järva County, in Estonia. It was the administrative centre of Koigi Parish.

Nurmsi Airfield (ICAO: EENI) is partially located on the territory of Koigi.
