= Huuksi =

Village in Estonia

Coordinates: 58°50′N 25°49′E

- Village
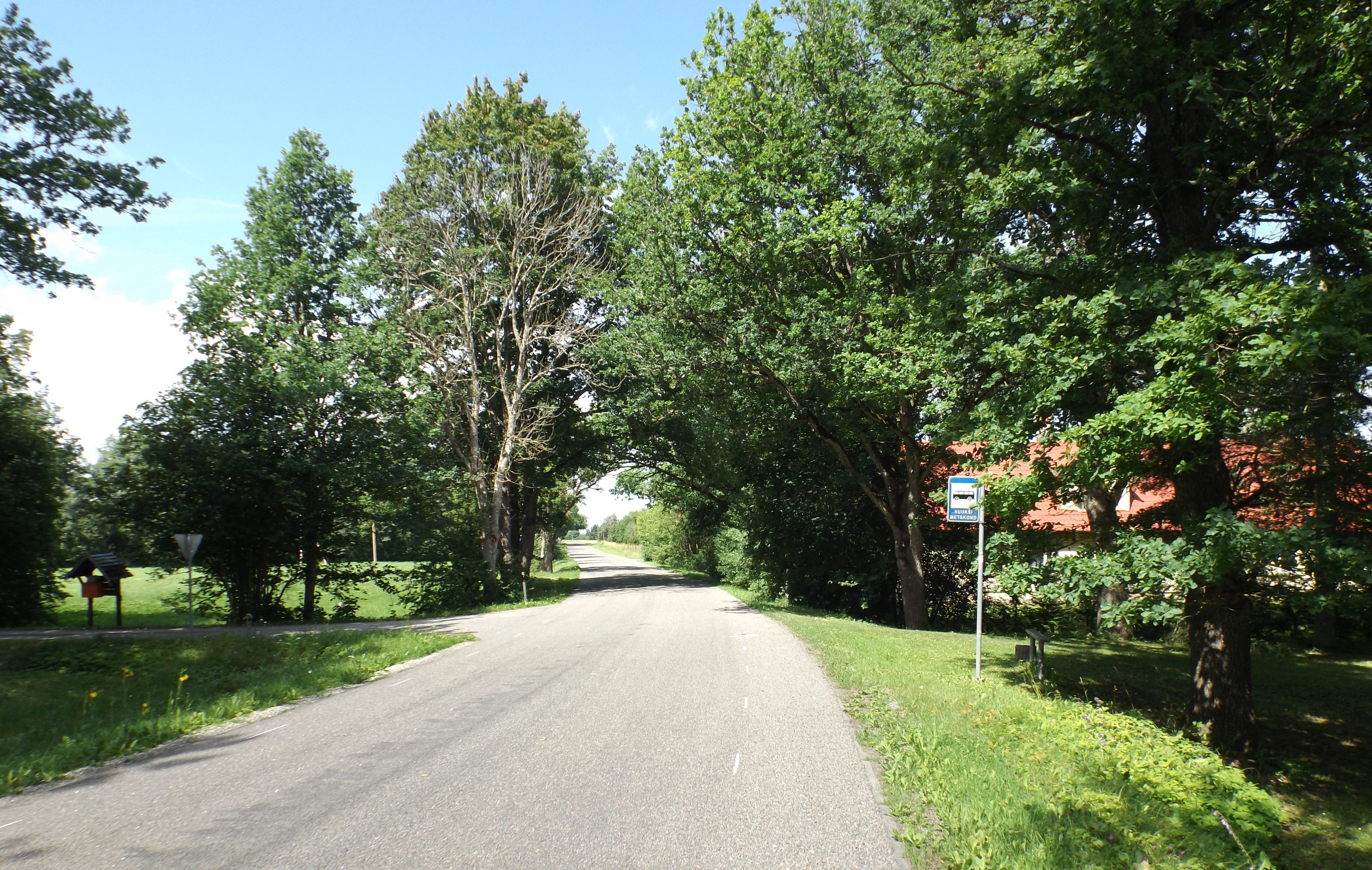
- Interactive map of Huuksi
- Country: Estonia
- County: Järva County
- Parish: Järva Parish
- Time zone: UTC+2 (EET)
  - Summer (DST): UTC+3 (EEST)

Huuksi (German: Hukas) is a village in Järva Parish, Järva County in northern-central Estonia.
