= Aino Bach =

Estonian artist (1901–1980)

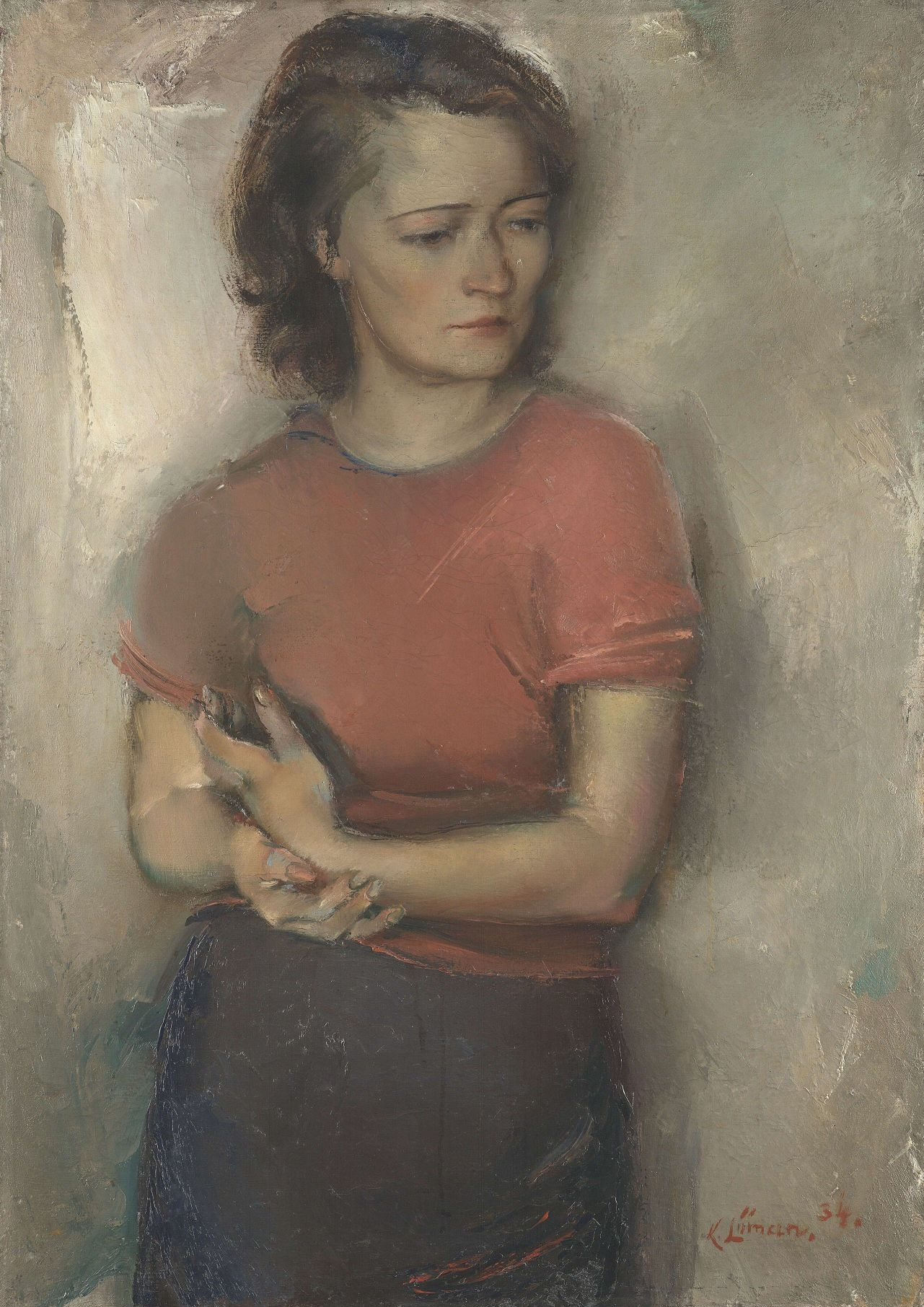
- Portrait of Aino Bach by Kaarel Liimand (1934)
- Born: 1 December 1901; Koeru, Governorate of Estonia, Russian Empire
- Died: 6 August 1980 (aged 78); Tallinn, then part of Estonian SSR, Soviet Union
- Other name: Aino Bach-Liimand
- Occupation: Graphic artist
- Awards: People’s Artist of the Estonian SSR

Aino Bach (1 December 1901 – 6 August 1980) was an Estonian artist known for her engravings and her portrayals of Soviet-era femininity.

== Biography ==
Aino Bach was born in Koeru, Estonia in 1901. As a child, she lived in Narva, and she attended secondary school in Siberia, before returning to Estonia in 1921. She studied painting at the Pallas Art School in Tartu under the supervision of Nikolai Triik, and engraving with Ado Vabbe, whom she shared socialist ideals with. In 1937, Bach married the painter Kaarel Liimand. She worked as a lecturer at her former art school (now renamed after Konrad Mägi) from 1940 to 1941.

In 1941, during the German occupation of Estonia, Bach was exiled in Yaroslav in the Soviet Union. There, she was an active member in the Union of Estonian Artists (ENSV Kunstnike Liit), founded in 1943. She played a large role in the reorganization of Estonian artistic life with this organization. She was a mentor to fellow Estonian artist Evald Okas. Bach was awarded the State Prize of the Estonian SSR in 1947.

After the war, Bach settled in Tallinn. She was awarded People’s Artist of the Estonian SSR in 1961. Bach died in Tallinn on August 6, 1980.

== Artistry ==
Many of Bach's works portray women, representing many different settings and professions. Her style has been described as including both poetic realism and Socialist Realism. Many of her pieces were created using intaglio engraving techniques and she broadened the expressive abilities of the technique. She was praised to have a wealth of nuances and original style, utilizing metal point engraving, etching, and colored monotype, which she often used multiple of in her works. While some of Bach's art has been characterized as a product of Soviet propaganda, art critic Eha Komissarov has argued that Bach, a genuine political leftist, used Soviet iconography as a means to portray women's participation in public life. Later in her career, Bach painted portraits of public figures including Debora Vaarandi.
