= Suur-Randvere =

Village in Estonia

Coordinates: 58°18′43″N 22°24′43″E

- Village
- Interactive map of Suur-Randvere
- Country: Estonia
- County: Saare County
- Parish: Saaremaa Parish
- Time zone: UTC+2 (EET)
  - Summer (DST): UTC+3 (EEST)

Suur-Randvere (Randvere until 2017) is a village in Saaremaa Parish, Saare County in western Estonia.

During the administrative reform in 2017, the villages Koidu, Põlluküla, Tamsalu and Viira were unified with Randvere village, which was thereafter renamed Suur-Randvere.

Before the administrative reform in 2017, the village was in Lääne-Saare Parish.
