= Peetri =

Borough in Estonia

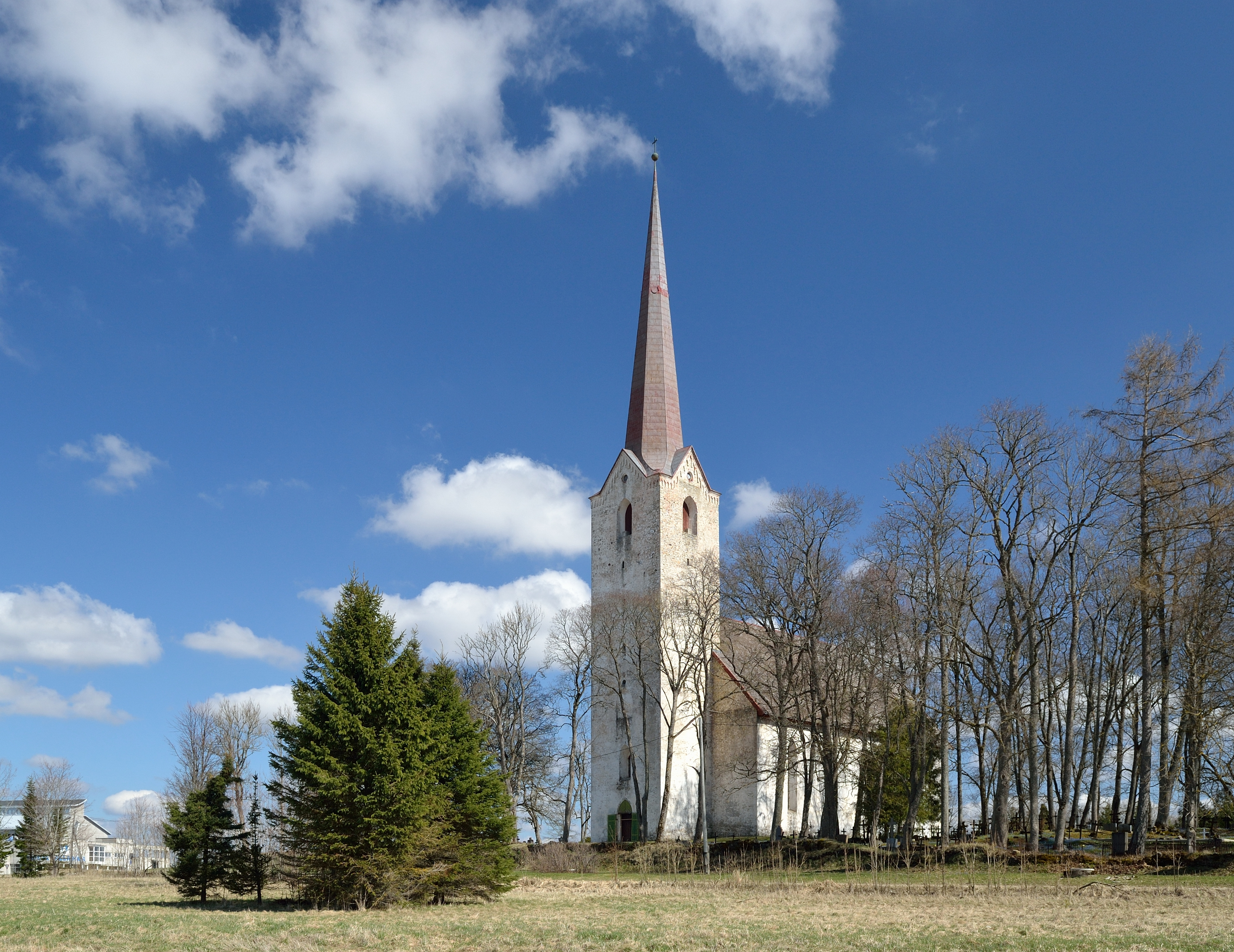
- Järva-Peetri Church

- Location within Estonia
- Coordinates: 58°56′35″N 25°50′09″E
- Country: Estonia
- County: Järva County
- Parish: Järva Parish

Population (01.01.2019)
  - Total: 189
- Time zone: UTC+2 (EET)

Peetri (German: Sankt Petri) is a small borough (alevik) in Järva Parish, Järva County in northern Estonia.
