= Koidu, Saare County =

Village in Estonia

Coordinates: 58°19′47″N 22°33′31″E

Koidu
- Village
- Interactive map of Koidu
- Country: Estonia
- County: Saare County
- Parish: Lääne-Saare Parish
- Time zone: UTC+2 (EET)
  - Summer (DST): UTC+3 (EEST)

Koidu was a village in Lääne-Saare Parish, Saare County in western Estonia.

During the administrative reform in 2017, the village was unified (along with several other villages) with Randvere village, which was thereafter renamed to Suur-Randvere.
