= Ervita =

Village in Estonia

- Village
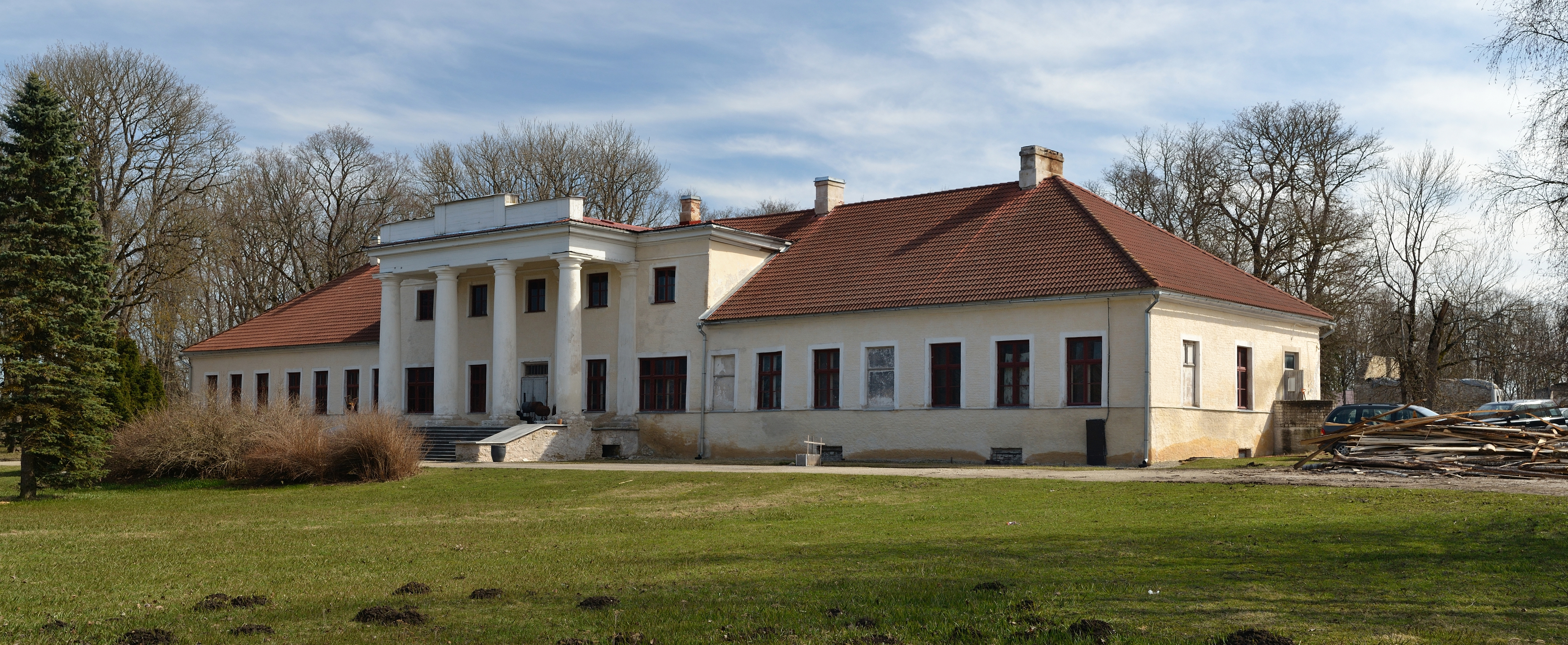
- Ervita manor

- Location in Estonia
- Coordinates: 58°56′N 26°05′E
- Country: Estonia
- County: Järva County
- Parish: Järva Parish
- Time zone: UTC+2 (EET)
  - Summer (DST): UTC+3 (EEST)

Ervita is a village in Järva Parish, Järva County in northern-central Estonia.

== Ervita manor ==
Ervita manor (German: Erwita) is mentioned for the first time in 1663. The present building dates from the early 19th century and is a simple Neoclassical building.

Russian general Gotthard Johann von Knorring was originally from Ervita manor.
