= Salutaguse, Järva County =

Village in Estonia

Coordinates: 58°59′34″N 25°56′09″E

Salutaguse
- Village
- Interactive map of Salutaguse
- Country: Estonia
- County: Järva County
- Parish: Järva Parish
- Time zone: UTC+2 (EET)
  - Summer (DST): UTC+3 (EEST)

Salutaguse is a village in Järva Parish, Järva County, in northern-central Estonia.
