= Küti, Järva County =

Village in Estonia

Coordinates: 58°57′31″N 25°51′18″E

Küti
- Village
- Interactive map of Küti
- Country: Estonia
- County: Järva County
- Parish: Järva Parish
- Time zone: UTC+2 (EET)
  - Summer (DST): UTC+3 (EEST)

Küti is a village in Järva Parish, Järva County in northern-central Estonia.
