= Kapu, Estonia =

Village in Estonia

Coordinates: 58°59′N 26°02′E

Kapu
- Village
- Interactive map of Kapu
- Country: Estonia
- County: Järva County
- Parish: Järva Parish
- Time zone: UTC+2 (EET)
  - Summer (DST): UTC+3 (EEST)

Kapu (German: Kappo) is a village in Järva Parish, Järva County in northern-central Estonia.

The tallest structure in Estonia, Koeru TV Mast, is located in Kapu village.
