= Jõeküla, Järva Parish =

Village in Estonia

Coordinates: 58°50′14″N 26°04′42″E

Jõeküla
- Village
- Interactive map of Jõeküla
- Country: Estonia
- County: Järva County
- Parish: Järva Parish
- Time zone: UTC+2 (EET)
  - Summer (DST): UTC+3 (EEST)

Jõeküla is a village in Järva Parish, Järva County in northern-central Estonia.
