= Abaja, Järva County =

Village in Estonia

Abaja
- Village
- Location in Estonia
- Coordinates: 58°55′N 25°57′E
- Country: Estonia
- County: Järva County
- Parish: Järva Parish
- Time zone: UTC+2 (EET)
  - Summer (DST): UTC+3 (EEST)

Abaja is a village in Järva Parish, Järva County in northern-central Estonia.
