= Kuti (Sokolac) =

- Village
- Location within Bosnia and Herzegovina
- Coordinates: 44°02′19″N 18°51′25″E
- Country: Bosnia and Herzegovina
- Entity: Republika Srpska
- Municipality: Sokolac
- Time zone: UTC+1 (CET)
  - Summer (DST): UTC+2 (CEST)

Kuti (Serbian: Кути) is a village in the municipality of Sokolac, Bosnia and Herzegovina. According to the 2013 census, Kuti has a population of 50.

== Population ==
The nationalities of the population in the town of Kuti are shown in the table.

Nationality	1961	1971	1981.	1991.	2013.
Muslims*/Bosniaks	72	312	266	248	49
Serbs	67	9	5	2	0
Croats	7	0	1	2	0
Yugoslavs	229	0	2	0	0
Others and unknown	0	3	0	1	1
Total:	375	324	274	253	50

*The term Muslims was used in population censuses until 1991, after which it was replaced by the term Bosniaks.
