= Jõeküla, Hiiu County =

Village in Estonia

Jõeküla
- Village
- Location within Estonia
- Coordinates: 58°50′51″N 22°51′57″E
- Country: Estonia
- County: Hiiu County
- Parish: Hiiumaa Parish
- Time zone: UTC+2 (EET)
  - Summer (DST): UTC+3 (EEST)

Jõeküla is a village in Hiiumaa Parish, Hiiu County in northwestern Estonia.

The village was first mentioned in 1726 (Bach-Dorff). Historically, the village was part of Vaemla Manor (German: Waimel).

The Vaemla River flows through the village.

In 1977, the village of Pasti was merged into Jõeküla.
