= Päinurme =

Village in Estonia

Coordinates: 58°49′N 25°56′E

- Village
- Interactive map of Päinurme
- Country: Estonia
- County: Järva County
- Parish: Järva Parish
- Time zone: UTC+2 (EET)
  - Summer (DST): UTC+3 (EEST)

Päinurme (German: Assik) is a village in Järva Parish, Järva County in northern-central Estonia.
