= Koidu-Ellavere =

Village in Estonia

- Village
- Location within Estonia
- Coordinates: 58°55′N 26°0′E
- Country: Estonia
- County: Järva County
- Parish: Järva Parish

Population (2010)
  - Total: 25
- Time zone: UTC+2 (EET)
  - Summer (DST): UTC+3 (EEST)

Koidu-Ellavere is a village in Järva Parish, Järva County in northern-central Estonia.
