= Järva Parish =

Municipality of Estonia

Järva Parish Järva vald
- Municipality of Estonia
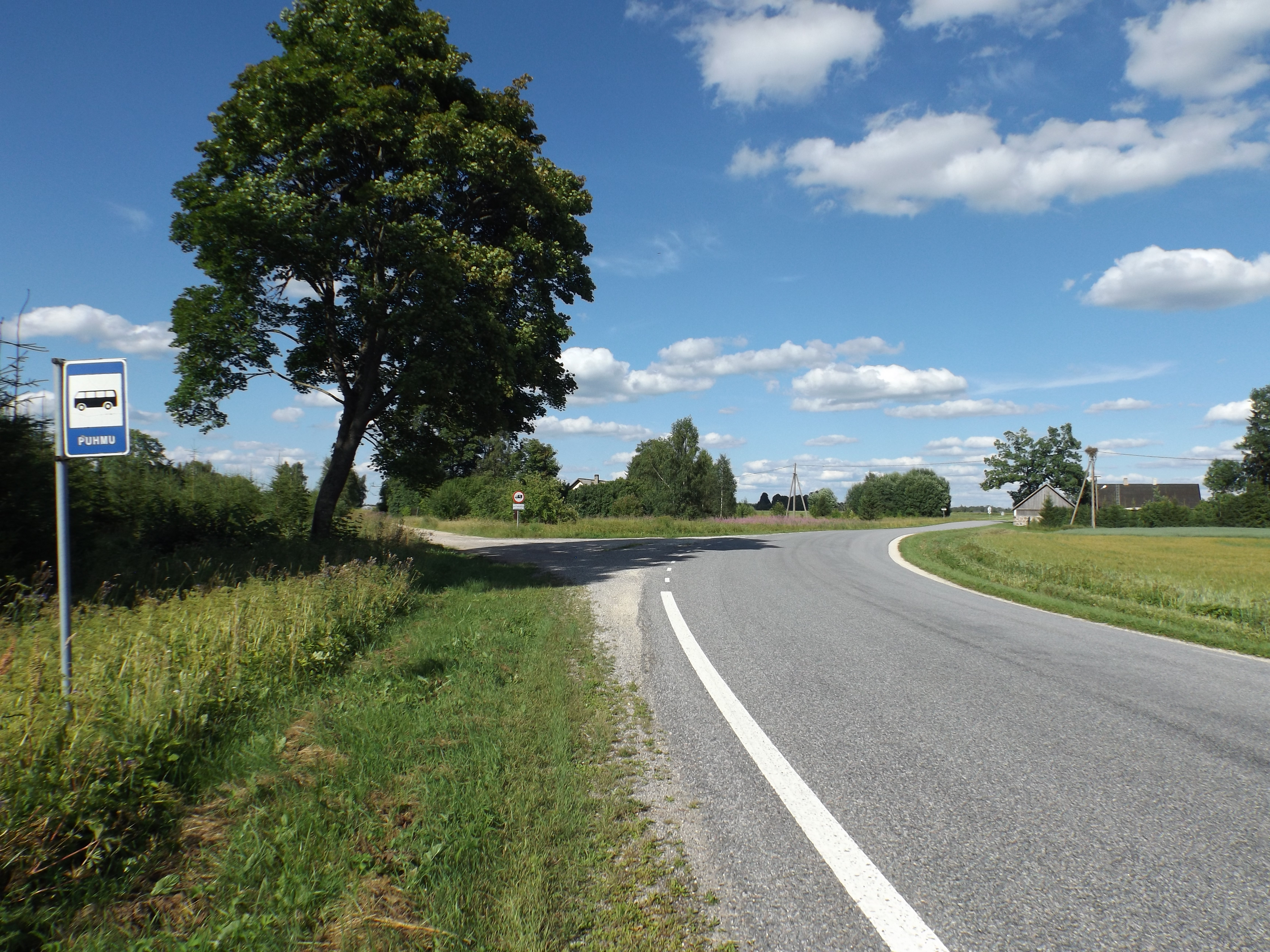
- Järva Parish, Puhmu village

- Flag Coat of arms

- Järva Parish within Järva County.
- Coordinates: 59°01′59″N 25°52′59″E
- Country: Estonia
- County: Järva County
- Administrative centre: Järva-Jaani

Area
  - Total: 1,223 km^{2} (472 sq mi)

Population (2026)
  - Total: 8,751
  - Density: 7.155/km^{2} (18.53/sq mi)
- ISO 3166 code: EE-255
- Website: jarvavald.kovtp.ee

Järva Parish is a municipality in Järva County, Estonia. It was created in 2017 as a merger of 6 municipalities: Albu Parish, Ambla Parish, Imavere Parish, Järva-Jaani Parish, Kareda Parish and Koigi Parish.

== Settlements ==
There is one borough - Järva-Jaani, five small boroughs - Aravete, Ambla, Koeru, Käravete and Peetri, and 74 villages in the parish.

== Demographics ==
As of 1 January 2026, the parish had 8,751 residents, of which 4,502 (51.4%) were women and 4,249 (48.6%) were men.

=== Religion ===
In terms of religion, 7.6% of the residents older than fifteen years living in the municipality declared themselves Lutheran in the 2021 census, and 2.2% declared themselves other Christians. The majority of residents of the parish, 86.3% declared themselves religiously unaffiliated. 0.4 % of the population follows other religions and 3.6% did not specify their religious affiliation.

== Notable people ==
- Gotthard Johann von Knorring (1744/1746 in Ervita – 1825), a Russian, Baltic German general
- Jaan Jung (1835 in Tammeküla – 1900), educator, cultural figure, and archeology and history enthusiast.
- Eduard von Gebhardt (1838 in Järva-Jaani - 1925), a Baltic German painter of portraits and historical scenes
- Johan Pitka (1872 in Jalgsema – 1944), an entrepreneur and sea captain who was the Commander of the Estonian Navy
- A. H. Tammsaare (1878 in Vetepere – 1940), writer, his pentalogy Truth and Justice is a major work of Estonian literature
- Ekaterina Kalinina (1882 in Esna – 1960), the wife of Soviet politician Mikhail Kalinin (1875–1946)
- Axel de Vries (1892 in Preedi Manor – 1963), a Baltic German and German politician; member of 2nd Riigikogu.
- Karl Selter (1898 in Koeru – 1958), politician, Minister of Finance, 1933 to 1938 & Minister of Foreign affairs, 1938 to 1939.
- Aino Bach (1901 in Koeru – 1980), artist known for her engravings and portrayals of Soviet-era femininity
- Enn Toona (1909 in Väinjärve – 1973), actor and director, principal stage manager of Endla Theatre, 1964-1969
- Arved Toots (1930 in Aravete – 1992), agronomist and breeder of Tori horses
- Ene Mihkelson (1944 in Imavere – 2017), novelist and poet, she examined national identity and historical memory
- Pavo Raudsepp (born 1973 in Koeru), a cross-country skier, competed in the sprint event at the 2002 Winter Olympics
- Karel Voolaid (born 1977 in Koeru), football manager and former player who played 209 games.
- Elina Pähklimägi (born 1983 in Ambla), stage, TV and film actress
- Gert Kams (born 1985 in Koeru), footballer who played 505 games and 60 for Estonia
- Jaak Madison (born 1991), politician, Member of the European Parliament
