= Vysoky (inhabited locality) =

Vysoky (Russian: Высо́кий; masculine), Vysokaya (Высо́кая; feminine), or Vysokoye (Высо́кое; neuter) is the name of several inhabited localities in Russia.

== Modern localities ==
=== Amur Oblast ===
As of 2010, two rural localities in Amur Oblast bear this name:

- Vysokoye, Mikhaylovsky District, Amur Oblast, a selo in Novochesnokovsky Rural Settlement of Mikhaylovsky District
- Vysokoye, Romnensky District, Amur Oblast, a selo in Rogozovsky Rural Settlement of Romnensky District

=== Arkhangelsk Oblast ===
As of 2010, two rural localities in Arkhangelsk Oblast bear this name:

- Vysokoye, Arkhangelsk Oblast, a village in Yemetsky Selsoviet of Kholmogorsky District
- Vysokaya, Arkhangelsk Oblast, a village in Trufanogorsky Selsoviet of Pinezhsky District

=== Republic of Bashkortostan ===
As of 2010, one rural locality in the Republic of Bashkortostan bears this name:

- Vysokaya, Republic of Bashkortostan, a village in Ulu-Telyaksky Selsoviet of Iglinsky District

=== Belgorod Oblast ===
As of 2010, seven rural localities in Belgorod Oblast bear this name:

- Vysoky, Gubkinsky District, Belgorod Oblast, a khutor in Gubkinsky District
- Vysoky (Utyanskoye Rural Settlement), Krasnogvardeysky District, Belgorod Oblast, a khutor in Krasnogvardeysky District; municipally, a part of Utyanskoye Rural Settlement of that district
- Vysoky (Kalinovskoye Rural Settlement), Krasnogvardeysky District, Belgorod Oblast, a khutor in Krasnogvardeysky District; municipally, a part of Kalinovskoye Rural Settlement of that district
- Vysoky, Krasnoyaruzhsky District, Belgorod Oblast, a khutor in Krasnoyaruzhsky District
- Vysoky, Prokhorovsky District, Belgorod Oblast, a khutor in Prokhorovsky District
- Vysoky, Starooskolsky District, Belgorod Oblast, a khutor in Starooskolsky District
- Vysokoye, Belgorod Oblast, a selo in Yakovlevsky District

=== Bryansk Oblast ===
As of 2010, eight rural localities in Bryansk Oblast bear this name:

- Vysoky, Surazhsky District, Bryansk Oblast, a settlement in Dushatinsky Selsoviet of Surazhsky District
- Vysoky, Trubchevsky District, Bryansk Oblast, a settlement in Ryabchovsky Selsoviet of Trubchevsky District
- Vysokoye, Mglinsky District, Bryansk Oblast, a selo in Vysoksky Selsoviet of Mglinsky District
- Vysokoye, Rognedinsky District, Bryansk Oblast, a village in Fedorovsky Selsoviet of Rognedinsky District
- Vysokoye (selo), Vysoksky Selsoviet, Unechsky District, Bryansk Oblast, a selo in Vysoksky Selsoviet of Unechsky District
- Vysokoye (settlement), Vysoksky Selsoviet, Unechsky District, Bryansk Oblast, a settlement in Vysoksky Selsoviet of Unechsky District
- Vysokoye, Norinsky Selsoviet, Zhiryatinsky District, Bryansk Oblast, a village in Norinsky Selsoviet of Zhiryatinsky District
- Vysokoye, Vysoksky Selsoviet, Zhiryatinsky District, Bryansk Oblast, a selo in Vysoksky Selsoviet of Zhiryatinsky District

=== Chelyabinsk Oblast ===
As of 2010, one rural locality in Chelyabinsk Oblast bears this name:

- Vysoky, Chelyabinsk Oblast, a settlement in Poletayevsky Selsoviet of Sosnovsky District

=== Kaliningrad Oblast ===
As of 2010, five rural localities in Kaliningrad Oblast bear this name:

- Vysokoye, Bagrationovsky District, Kaliningrad Oblast, a settlement in Dolgorukovsky Rural Okrug of Bagrationovsky District
- Vysokoye, Guryevsky District, Kaliningrad Oblast, a settlement in Nizovsky Rural Okrug of Guryevsky District
- Vysokoye, Krasnoznamensky District, Kaliningrad Oblast, a settlement in Dobrovolsky Rural Okrug of Krasnoznamensky District
- Vysokoye, Nesterovsky District, Kaliningrad Oblast, a settlement in Ilyushinsky Rural Okrug of Nesterovsky District
- Vysokoye, Slavsky District, Kaliningrad Oblast, a settlement in Bolshakovsky Rural Okrug of Slavsky District

=== Kaluga Oblast ===
As of 2010, seven rural localities in Kaluga Oblast bear this name:

- Vysokoye, Babyninsky District, Kaluga Oblast, a village in Babyninsky District
- Vysokoye, Duminichsky District, Kaluga Oblast, a village in Duminichsky District
- Vysokoye, Khvastovichsky District, Kaluga Oblast, a village in Khvastovichsky District
- Vysokoye (Mokroye Rural Settlement), Kuybyshevsky District, Kaluga Oblast, a village in Kuybyshevsky District; municipally, a part of Mokroye Rural Settlement of that district
- Vysokoye (Vysokoye Rural Settlement), Kuybyshevsky District, Kaluga Oblast, a village in Kuybyshevsky District; municipally, a part of Vysokoye Rural Settlement of that district
- Vysokoye, Meshchovsky District, Kaluga Oblast, a village in Meshchovsky District
- Vysokoye, Mosalsky District, Kaluga Oblast, a village in Mosalsky District

=== Khanty-Mansi Autonomous Okrug ===
As of 2010, one urban locality in Khanty-Mansi Autonomous Okrug bears this name:

- Vysoky, Khanty-Mansi Autonomous Okrug, an urban-type settlement under the administrative jurisdiction of the town of okrug significance of Megion

=== Kirov Oblast ===
As of 2010, one rural locality in Kirov Oblast bears this name:

- Vysokaya, Kirov Oblast, a village in Vysokoramensky Rural Okrug of Shabalinsky District

=== Kostroma Oblast ===
As of 2010, two rural localities in Kostroma Oblast bear this name:

- Vysokoye, Kostroma Oblast, a village in Vlasovskoye Settlement of Oktyabrsky District
- Vysokaya, Kostroma Oblast, a village in Medveditskoye Settlement of Pavinsky District

=== Krasnodar Krai ===
As of 2010, three rural localities in Krasnodar Krai bear this name:

- Vysoky, Kurganinsky District, Krasnodar Krai, a settlement in Novoalekseyevsky Rural Okrug of Kurganinsky District
- Vysoky, Mostovsky District, Krasnodar Krai, a khutor under the administrative jurisdiction of Mostovskoy Settlement Okrug of Mostovsky District
- Vysokoye, Krasnodar Krai, a selo in Moldovsky Rural Okrug under the administrative jurisdiction of the City of Sochi

=== Kursk Oblast ===
As of 2010, two rural localities in Kursk Oblast bear this name:

- Vysokoye, Glushkovsky District, Kursk Oblast, a selo in Nizhnemordoksky Selsoviet of Glushkovsky District
- Vysokoye, Medvensky District, Kursk Oblast, a selo in Vysoksky Selsoviet of Medvensky District

=== Republic of Mordovia ===
As of 2010, three rural localities in the Republic of Mordovia bear this name:

- Vysokoye, Kovylkinsky District, Republic of Mordovia, a selo in Pokrovsky Selsoviet of Kovylkinsky District
- Vysokoye, Temnikovsky District, Republic of Mordovia, a village in Babeyevsky Selsoviet of Temnikovsky District
- Vysokaya, Republic of Mordovia, a village under the administrative jurisdiction of the work settlement of Kadoshkino in Kadoshkinsky District

=== Moscow Oblast ===
As of 2010, two rural localities in Moscow Oblast bear this name:

- Vysokoye, Mozhaysky District, Moscow Oblast, a village in Zamoshinskoye Rural Settlement of Mozhaysky District
- Vysokoye, Shakhovskoy District, Moscow Oblast, a village in Seredinskoye Rural Settlement of Shakhovskoy District

=== Murmansk Oblast ===
As of 2010, one rural locality in Murmansk Oblast bears this name:

- Vysoky, Murmansk Oblast, an inhabited locality under the administrative jurisdiction of Olenegorsk Town with Jurisdictional Territory

=== Nizhny Novgorod Oblast ===
As of 2010, one rural locality in Nizhny Novgorod Oblast bears this name:

- Vysokaya, Nizhny Novgorod Oblast, a village in Kuznetsovsky Selsoviet of Chkalovsky District

=== Novgorod Oblast ===
As of 2012, six rural localities in Novgorod Oblast bear this name:

- Vysokoye, Chudovsky District, Novgorod Oblast, a village in Tregubovskoye Settlement of Chudovsky District
- Vysokoye, Krasnoborskoye Settlement, Kholmsky District, Novgorod Oblast, a village in Krasnoborskoye Settlement of Kholmsky District
- Vysokoye, Togodskoye Settlement, Kholmsky District, Novgorod Oblast, a village in Togodskoye Settlement of Kholmsky District
- Vysokoye, Moshenskoy District, Novgorod Oblast, a village in Orekhovskoye Settlement of Moshenskoy District
- Vysokoye, Nagovskoye Settlement, Starorussky District, Novgorod Oblast, a village in Nagovskoye Settlement of Starorussky District
- Vysokoye, Velikoselskoye Settlement, Starorussky District, Novgorod Oblast, a village in Velikoselskoye Settlement of Starorussky District

=== Oryol Oblast ===
As of 2010, nine rural localities in Oryol Oblast bear this name:

- Vysoky, Berezovsky Selsoviet, Dmitrovsky District, Oryol Oblast, a settlement in Berezovsky Selsoviet of Dmitrovsky District
- Vysoky, Dolbenkinsky Selsoviet, Dmitrovsky District, Oryol Oblast, a settlement in Dolbenkinsky Selsoviet of Dmitrovsky District
- Vysoky, Kromskoy District, Oryol Oblast, a settlement in Apalkovsky Selsoviet of Kromskoy District
- Vysokoye, Mtsensky District, Oryol Oblast, a village in Vysokinsky Selsoviet of Mtsensky District
- Vysokoye, Orlovsky District, Oryol Oblast, a village in Stanovskoy Selsoviet of Orlovsky District
- Vysokoye, Pokrovsky District, Oryol Oblast, a village in Verkhnezhernovsky Selsoviet of Pokrovsky District
- Vysokoye, Shablykinsky District, Oryol Oblast, a selo in Kosulichesky Selsoviet of Shablykinsky District
- Vysokoye, Trosnyansky District, Oryol Oblast, a selo in Pennovsky Selsoviet of Trosnyansky District
- Vysokoye, Znamensky District, Oryol Oblast, a village in Uzkinsky Selsoviet of Znamensky District

=== Penza Oblast ===
As of 2010, one rural locality in Penza Oblast bears this name:

- Vysokoye, Penza Oblast, a selo in Vysokinsky Selsoviet of Bashmakovsky District

=== Primorsky Krai ===
As of 2010, one rural locality in Primorsky Krai bears this name:

- Vysokoye, Primorsky Krai, a selo in Chernigovsky District

=== Pskov Oblast ===
As of 2010, five rural localities in Pskov Oblast bear this name:

- Vysokoye, Dedovichsky District, Pskov Oblast, a village in Dedovichsky District
- Vysokoye, Nevelsky District, Pskov Oblast, a village in Nevelsky District
- Vysokoye, Novorzhevsky District, Pskov Oblast, a village in Novorzhevsky District
- Vysokoye, Opochetsky District, Pskov Oblast, a village in Opochetsky District
- Vysokoye, Strugo-Krasnensky District, Pskov Oblast, a village in Strugo-Krasnensky District

=== Rostov Oblast ===
As of 2010, one rural locality in Rostov Oblast bears this name:

- Vysoky, Rostov Oblast, a settlement in Tyulpanovskoye Rural Settlement of Zavetinsky District

=== Ryazan Oblast ===
As of 2010, seven rural localities in Ryazan Oblast bear this name:

- Vysokoye, Pitelinsky District, Ryazan Oblast, a selo in Novounkorsky Rural Okrug of Pitelinsky District
- Vysokoye, Ryazansky District, Ryazan Oblast, a selo in Vysokovsky Rural Okrug of Ryazansky District
- Vysokoye, Rybnovsky District, Ryazan Oblast, a village in Baturinsky Rural Okrug of Rybnovsky District
- Vysokoye, Sarayevsky District, Ryazan Oblast, a selo in Vysokovsky Rural Okrug of Sarayevsky District
- Vysokoye, Shatsky District, Ryazan Oblast, a selo in Pechinsky Rural Okrug of Shatsky District
- Vysokoye, Skopinsky District, Ryazan Oblast, a selo in Ilyinsky Rural Okrug of Skopinsky District
- Vysokoye, Yermishinsky District, Ryazan Oblast, a village in Kafteysky Rural Okrug of Yermishinsky District

=== Sakhalin Oblast ===
As of 2010, one rural locality in Sakhalin Oblast bears this name:

- Vysokoye, Sakhalin Oblast, a selo in Anivsky District

=== Samara Oblast ===
As of 2010, one rural locality in Samara Oblast bears this name:

- Vysokoye, Samara Oblast, a selo in Pestravsky District

=== Saratov Oblast ===
As of 2010, one rural locality in Saratov Oblast bears this name:

- Vysokoye, Saratov Oblast, a selo in Krasnoarmeysky District

=== Smolensk Oblast ===
As of 2010, ten rural localities in Smolensk Oblast bear this name:

- Vysokoye, Gagarinsky District, Smolensk Oblast, a village in Prechistenskoye Rural Settlement of Gagarinsky District
- Vysokoye, Kholm-Zhirkovsky District, Smolensk Oblast, a village in Bogdanovskoye Rural Settlement of Kholm-Zhirkovsky District
- Vysokoye, Monastyrshchinsky District, Smolensk Oblast, a village in Tatarskoye Rural Settlement of Monastyrshchinsky District
- Vysokoye, Izvekovskoye Rural Settlement, Novoduginsky District, Smolensk Oblast, a village in Izvekovskoye Rural Settlement of Novoduginsky District
- Vysokoye, Vysokovskoye Rural Settlement, Novoduginsky District, Smolensk Oblast, a selo in Vysokovskoye Rural Settlement of Novoduginsky District
- Vysokoye, Safonovsky District, Smolensk Oblast, a village in Baranovskoye Rural Settlement of Safonovsky District
- Vysokoye, Smolensky District, Smolensk Oblast, a village in Kozinskoye Rural Settlement of Smolensky District
- Vysokoye, Zakharyevskoye Rural Settlement, Ugransky District, Smolensk Oblast, a village in Zakharyevskoye Rural Settlement of Ugransky District
- Vysokoye, Znamenskoye Rural Settlement, Ugransky District, Smolensk Oblast, a village in Znamenskoye Rural Settlement of Ugransky District
- Vysokoye, Yelninsky District, Smolensk Oblast, a village in Mutishchenskoye Rural Settlement of Yelninsky District

=== Sverdlovsk Oblast ===
As of 2010, one rural locality in Sverdlovsk Oblast bears this name:

- Vysoky, Sverdlovsk Oblast, a settlement under the administrative jurisdiction of the Town of Krasnouralsk

=== Tomsk Oblast ===
As of 2010, one rural locality in Tomsk Oblast bears this name:

- Vysokoye, Tomsk Oblast, a selo in Zyryansky District

=== Tula Oblast ===
As of 2010, six rural localities in Tula Oblast bear this name:

- Vysoky, Tula Oblast, a settlement in Novopokrovskaya Rural Administration of Chernsky District
- Vysokoye, Dubensky District, Tula Oblast, a village in Nadezhdinsky Rural Okrug of Dubensky District
- Vysokoye, Leninsky District, Tula Oblast, a selo in Bezhkovsky Rural Okrug of Leninsky District
- Vysokoye, Odoyevsky District, Tula Oblast, a village in Okorokovskaya Rural Administration of Odoyevsky District
- Vysokoye, Venyovsky District, Tula Oblast, a village in Kozlovsky Rural Okrug of Venyovsky District
- Vysokoye, Volovsky District, Tula Oblast, a village in Krasnodubrovsky Rural Okrug of Volovsky District

=== Tver Oblast ===
As of 2010, twenty rural localities in Tver Oblast bear this name:

- Vysokoye, Kalyazinsky District, Tver Oblast, a village in Kalyazinsky District
- Vysokoye, Kesovogorsky District, Tver Oblast, a selo in Kesovogorsky District
- Vysokoye (Borkovskoye Rural Settlement), Kuvshinovsky District, Tver Oblast, a village in Kuvshinovsky District; municipally, a part of Borkovskoye Rural Settlement of that district
- Vysokoye (Vasilkovskoye Rural Settlement), Kuvshinovsky District, Tver Oblast, a village in Kuvshinovsky District; municipally, a part of Vasilkovskoye Rural Settlement of that district
- Vysokoye, Likhoslavlsky District, Tver Oblast, a village in Likhoslavlsky District
- Vysokoye (Nelidovskoye Rural Settlement), Nelidovsky District, Tver Oblast, a village in Nelidovsky District; municipally, a part of Nelidovskoye Rural Settlement of that district
- Vysokoye (Vysokinskoye Rural Settlement), Nelidovsky District, Tver Oblast, a village in Nelidovsky District; municipally, a part of Vysokinskoye Rural Settlement of that district
- Vysokoye (Grishinskoye Rural Settlement), Oleninsky District, Tver Oblast, a village in Oleninsky District; municipally, a part of Grishinskoye Rural Settlement of that district
- Vysokoye (Mostovskoye Rural Settlement), Oleninsky District, Tver Oblast, a village in Oleninsky District; municipally, a part of Mostovskoye Rural Settlement of that district
- Vysokoye (Gusevskoye Rural Settlement), Oleninsky District, Tver Oblast, a village in Oleninsky District; municipally, a part of Gusevskoye Rural Settlement of that district
- Vysokoye, Ostashkovsky District, Tver Oblast, a village in Ostashkovsky District
- Vysokoye, Selizharovsky District, Tver Oblast, a village in Selizharovsky District
- Vysokoye, Staritsky District, Tver Oblast, a village in Staritsky District
- Vysokoye, Toropetsky District, Tver Oblast, a village in Toropetsky District
- Vysokoye (settlement), Torzhoksky District, Tver Oblast, a settlement in Torzhoksky District
- Vysokoye (village) (Vysokovskoye Rural Settlement), Torzhoksky District, Tver Oblast, a village in Torzhoksky District; municipally, a part of Vysokovskoye Rural Settlement of that district
- Vysokoye (village) (Strashevichskoye Rural Settlement), Torzhoksky District, Tver Oblast, a village in Torzhoksky District; municipally, a part of Strashevichskoye Rural Settlement of that district
- Vysokoye (village) (Strashevichskoye Rural Settlement), Torzhoksky District, Tver Oblast, a village in Torzhoksky District; municipally, a part of Strashevichskoye Rural Settlement of that district
- Vysokoye (Proninskoye Rural Settlement), Vesyegonsky District, Tver Oblast, a village in Vesyegonsky District; municipally, a part of Proninskoye Rural Settlement of that district
- Vysokoye (Chamerovskoye Rural Settlement), Vesyegonsky District, Tver Oblast, a village in Vesyegonsky District; municipally, a part of Chamerovskoye Rural Settlement of that district

=== Vologda Oblast ===
As of 2010, eleven rural localities in Vologda Oblast bear this name:

- Vysokoye, Cherepovetsky District, Vologda Oblast, a village in Dmitriyevsky Selsoviet of Cherepovetsky District
- Vysokoye, Ust-Kubinsky District, Vologda Oblast, a settlement in Ustyansky Selsoviet of Ust-Kubinsky District
- Vysokoye, Verkhovazhsky District, Vologda Oblast, a village in Naumovsky Selsoviet of Verkhovazhsky District
- Vysokaya, Babushkinsky District, Vologda Oblast, a village in Roslyatinsky Selsoviet of Babushkinsky District
- Vysokaya, Cherepovetsky District, Vologda Oblast, a village in Ivanovsky Selsoviet of Cherepovetsky District
- Vysokaya, Kichmengsko-Gorodetsky District, Vologda Oblast, a village in Kurilovsky Selsoviet of Kichmengsko-Gorodetsky District
- Vysokaya, Zavrazhsky Selsoviet, Nikolsky District, Vologda Oblast, a village in Zavrazhsky Selsoviet of Nikolsky District
- Vysokaya, Zelentsovsky Selsoviet, Nikolsky District, Vologda Oblast, a village in Zelentsovsky Selsoviet of Nikolsky District
- Vysokaya, Sokolsky District, Vologda Oblast, a village in Chuchkovsky Selsoviet of Sokolsky District
- Vysokaya, Velikoustyugsky District, Vologda Oblast, a village in Pokrovsky Selsoviet of Velikoustyugsky District
- Vysokaya, Vozhegodsky District, Vologda Oblast, a village in Mityukovsky Selsoviet of Vozhegodsky District

=== Voronezh Oblast ===
As of 2010, four rural localities in Voronezh Oblast bear this name:

- Vysoky, Olkhovatsky District, Voronezh Oblast, a khutor in Karayashnikovskoye Rural Settlement of Olkhovatsky District
- Vysoky, Talovsky District, Voronezh Oblast, a settlement in Kamenno-Stepnoye Rural Settlement of Talovsky District
- Vysokoye, Liskinsky District, Voronezh Oblast, a selo in Vysokinskoye Rural Settlement of Liskinsky District
- Vysokoye, Vorobyovsky District, Voronezh Oblast, a settlement in Muzhichanskoye Rural Settlement of Vorobyovsky District

== Renamed localities ==
- Vysokoye, until June 2012, name of the village of Vysokoye 1-ye in Krasnoborskoye Settlement of Kholmsky District of Novgorod Oblast

== Abolished localities ==
- Vysokoye, Soletsky District, Novgorod Oblast, a former village in Dubrovskoye Settlement of Soletsky District of Novgorod Oblast; abolished in June 2011
