= Vysokaya =

Vysokaya may refer to the following places in Russia:

- Vysokaya, Babushkinsky District, Vologda Oblast
- Vysokaya, Kichmengsko-Gorodetsky District, Vologda Oblast
- Vysokaya, Republic of Bashkortostan
- Vysokaya, Sokolsky District, Vologda Oblast
- Vysokaya, Velikoustyugsky District, Vologda Oblast
- Vysokaya, Vozhegodsky District, Vologda Oblast
- Mount Vysokaya, a mountain in Sverdlovsk Oblast

== See also ==
- Vysoky (disambiguation)
- Vysokoye (disambiguation)
