= Vysokoye =

Vysokoye (Russian: Высокое, lit. 'tall, high'), rural localities in Russia, may refer to:

- Vysokoye, Arkhangelsk Oblast, a village
- Vysokoye, Mikhaylovsky District, Amur Oblast, a selo
- Vysokoye, Romnensky District, Amur Oblast, a selo
- Vysokoye, Belgorod Oblast, a selo
- Vysokoye, Belgorod Oblast, a selo
- Vysokoye, Bagrationovsky District, Kaliningrad Oblast, a settlement
- Vysokoye, Guryevsky District, Kaliningrad Oblast, a settlement
- Vysokoye, Krasnoznamensky District, Kaliningrad Oblast, a settlement
- Vysokoye, Nesterovsky District, Kaliningrad Oblast, a settlement
- Vysokoye, Slavsky District, Kaliningrad Oblast, a settlement
- Vysokoye, Kirov Oblast, a village
- Vysokoye, Kostroma Oblast, a village
- Vysokoye, Krasnodar Krai, a selo
- Vysokoye, Kostroma Oblast, a village
- Vysokoye, Glushkovsky District, Kursk Oblast, a selo
- Vysokoye, Medvensky District, Kursk Oblast, a selo
- Vysokoye, Mtsensky District, Oryol Oblast, a village
- Vysokoye, Orlovsky District, Oryol Oblast, a village
- Vysokoye, Pokrovsky District, Oryol Oblast, a village
- Vysokoye, Shablykinsky District, Oryol Oblast, a selo
- Vysokoye, Trosnyansky District, Oryol Oblast, a selo
- Vysokoye, Znamensky District, Oryol Oblast, a village
- Vysokoye, Penza Oblast, a selo
- Vysokoye, Primorsky Krai, a selo
- Vysokoye, Dedovichsky District, Pskov Oblast, a village
- Vysokoye, Nevelsky District, Pskov Oblast, a village
- Vysokoye, Novorzhevsky District, Pskov Oblast, a village
- Vysokoye, Opochetsky District, Pskov Oblast, a village
- Vysokoye, Strugo-Krasnensky, Pskov Oblast, a village
- Vysokoye, Pitelinsky District, Ryazan Oblast, a selo
- Vysokoye, Ryazansky District, Ryazan Oblast, a selo
- Vysokoye, Rybnovsky District, Ryazan Oblast, a village
- Vysokoye, Sarayevsky District, Ryazan Oblast, a selo
- Vysokoye, Skopinsky District, Ryazan Oblast, a selo
- Vysokoye, Shatsky District, Ryazan Oblast, a selo
- Vysokoye, Yermishinsky District, Ryazan Oblast, a village
- Vysokoye, Samara Oblast, a selo
- Vysokoye, Saratov Oblast, a selo
- Vysokoye, Sakhalin Oblast, a selo
- Vysokoye, Tomsk Oblast, a selo
- Vysokoye, Dubensky District, Tula Oblast, a village
- Vysokoye, Leninsky District, Tula Oblast, a selo
- Vysokoye, Odoyevsky District, Tula Oblast, a village
- Vysokoye, Venyovsky District, Tula Oblast, a village
- Vysokoye, Volovsky District, Tula Oblast, a village
- Vysokoye, Ust-Kubinsky District, Vologda Oblast, a settlement
- Vysokoye, Verkhovazhsky District, Vologda Oblast, a village
- Vysokoye, Liskinsky District, Voronezh Oblast, a selo
- Vysokoye, Vorobyovsky District, Voronezh Oblast, a settlement

== See also ==
- Vysokaye
- Vysoke
- Vysoky
