= Vysoky =

Vysoky may refer to:

- Vysoky (lower stratovolcano)
- Vysoky (higher stratovolcano)
- Vysoky (inhabited locality) (Vysokaya, Vysokoye), several inhabited localities in Russia
- Vysokaya Mount, a mountain in the Middle Urals in Sverdlovsk Oblast, Russia
- Vysokaye, a town in Brest Oblast, Belarus

== See also ==
- Vysokaya (disambiguation), the feminine form of Vysoky
- Vysokoye (disambiguation), the neuter form of Vysoky
