= Mountain Kachkanar =

Highest peak of the Central Ural in Sverdlovsk Oblast

Kachkanar
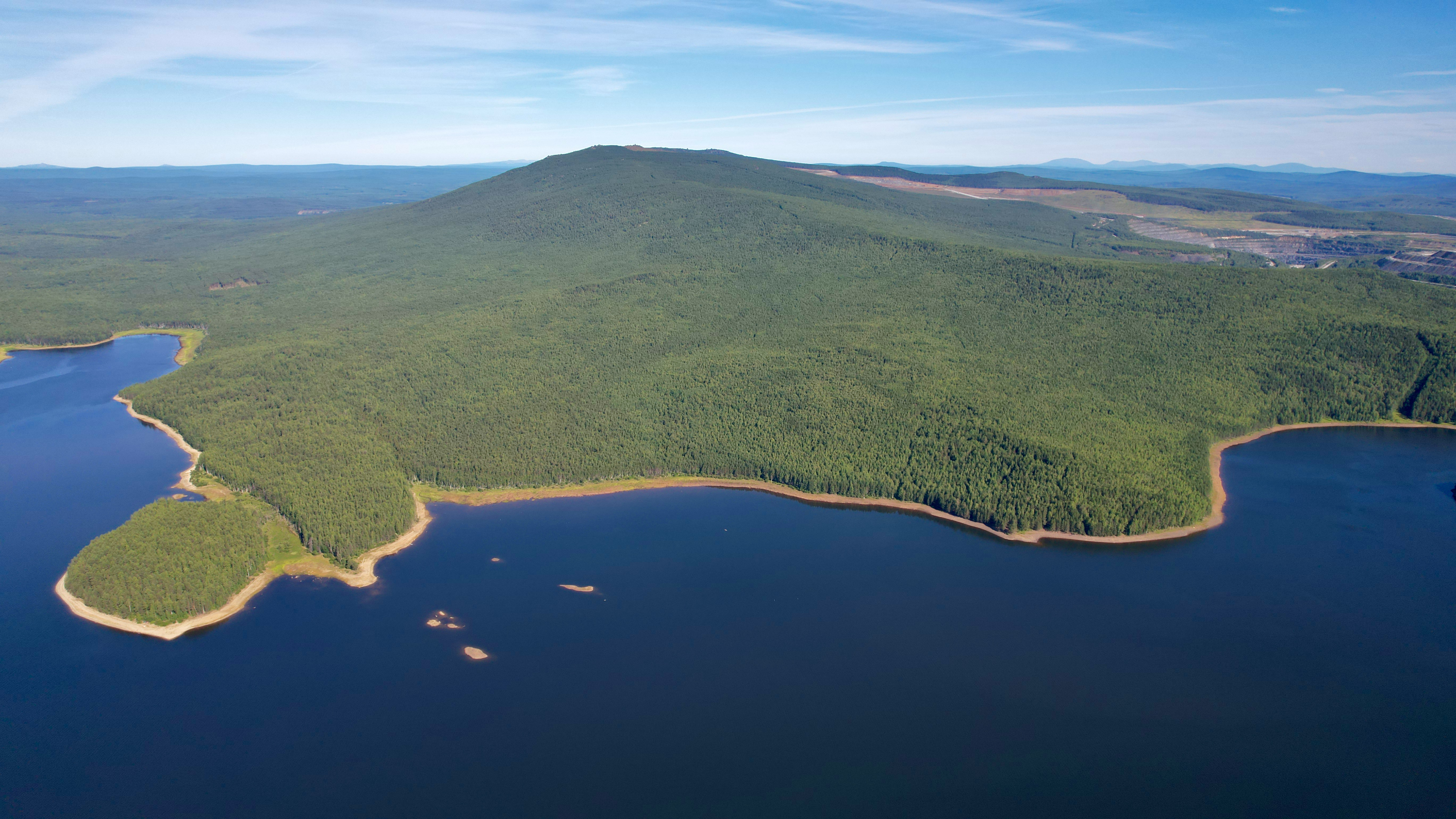

Highest point
- Elevation: 878.7 m (2,883 ft)
- Coordinates: 58°46′15″N 59°23′01″E

Geography
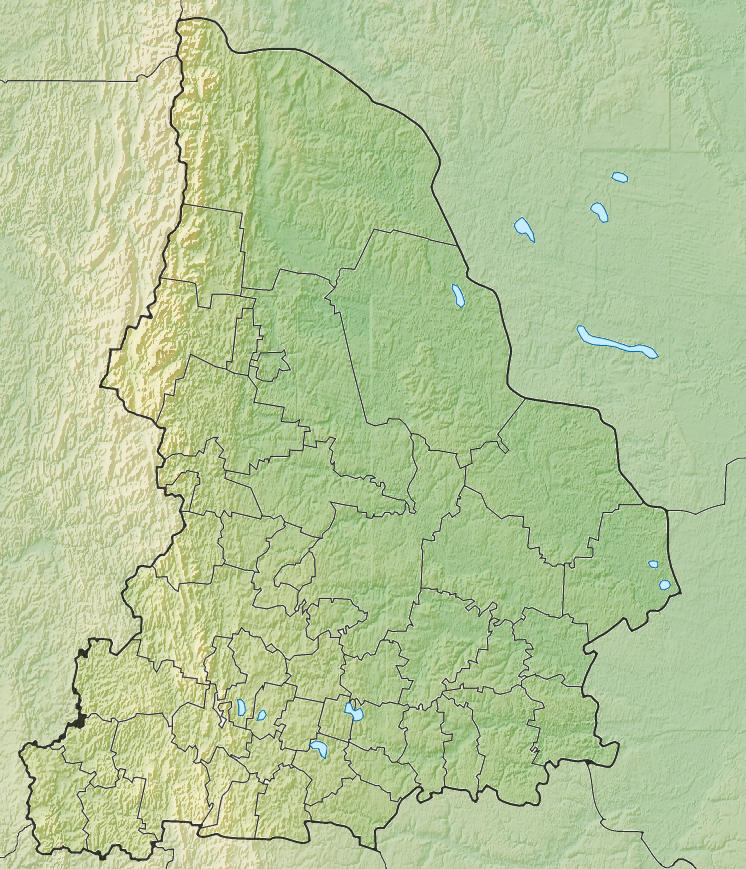
- Location within Sverdlovsk Oblast Location within European Russia
- Country: Russia
- Region: Sverdlovsk Oblast
- Parent range: Central Ural

Kachkanar (Russian: Качкана́р), is the highest peak of the Central Ural in Sverdlovsk Oblast, located near the geographical Europe-Asia border. Its altitude is 878.7 metres above sea level, with a relative elevation of about 600 metres. It is part of the mountain massif of the same name located on the right bank of the Is river. The town of Kachkanar is located at the foot of the mountain.

== Geographical position ==
Mountain Kachkanar is located in the Kachkanar urban district between the valleys of the Is and Vyya rivers (left tributaries of the Tura river). The slopes are covered with forest, the ridge is 3 km long, and there are stone placers and rocks. The Nizhne-Kachkanarskoye Reservoir and the town of Kachkanar are located at the southwestern foot.

== Toponym ==
The name of the mountain has no unambiguous interpretation. There are several versions of the origin of the toponym "Kachkanar".

- Version about the Turkic origin: Turkish: kashkanar — "bald camel". This version gained popularity because of the presence of a rock with the same name on the top of Kachkanar.
- Another version about the Turkic origin of the toponym is related to Tatar: kachkyn — "fugitive" and Tatar: kachkynnar — "fugitives".
- Kachkanar — "the peak where eagles land".
- Finno-Ugric version: Mansi: nar (ner, ner) — "stone mountain", "ridge", but the component "kachka" in this version cannot be explained. In the 18th century sources, the mountain is referred to as "Keskanar".

== Description ==
Mountain Kachkanar has a relative height of about 600 metres, the absolute height of the summit of North Kachkanar is 878.7 metres, while the South Kachkanar summit is 866.2 metres. The western slope of the mountain is steep, rocky and covered with boulder-like collapses of gabbro, pyroxenites and other rocks composing the massif. The Gusevy mountains are the foothills of Kachkanar, stretched meridionally and have the following (from south to north) names: Malaya Guseva (385 m), Bolshaya Guseva (467 m), Veselaya (345 m). Absolute elevations of the foothills of the mountains range from 240 to 280 metres. In the area of the Gusevy mountains, there are two small mountain rivers — Bolshaya and Malaya Gusevy, the tributaries of the Vyya river and originate on the eastern slope of mountain Kachkanar.

On one of the slopes, there is a small lake. On the mountain there is a now inactive skiing complex with a length of 2,300 metres and a height difference of 380 metres. The top of the mountain Kachkanar abounds with rocks of bizarre shapes, many of which have their own names. The most famous of these is the Camel Rock.

== History of exploration ==
At the beginning of the 19th century, most of the mountain was a part of the dacha of the Krestovozdvizhenskie gold and platinum mines of Bisersky zavod plant of Count Shuvalov Pyotr Pavlovich, and the smaller eastern part — in the dacha of the Nizhneturinskiy zavod factory, which was part of the Goroblagodatsky mining and factory district. Investigators found vein pieces of ore on the mountain that deflected the compass and used them at the nearby Isovskiy gold mines to separate noble metals from the ferruginous host rock. Later, the platinum fever broke out near Kachkanar. A Kachkanar mine was built. It was owned by Count Pyotr Ivanovich Shuvalov. However, all the rich platinum placers were quickly worked out, and only research scientists remained interested in Kachkanar.

Mountain Kachkanar lies from Palkina much more than thirty versts on the left side of Issa, which at the village, and afterward under the mountain itself. Having left very early in the morning, I had enough time, having examined the mountain and the iron mines along the Kaskanar, and having also collected considerable pieces of magnet, to return before evening. About 5 kilometers away from the Magnetic mountain a cross digging has been dug on the high southern part of the rising Kaskanar, which makes up a slope, from which they started to extract rich iron ore containing up to 59 percent of iron ore. The whole mountain is mottled with signs of this ironstone; though the protruding stones are composed of grey wild mountaineer. There is only one cliff about 20 fathoms to the west of the cross pit, which is composed of hard ironstone, and it is about 4 fathoms high and wide: the Voguls both about these ore places and about magnetic pits have long ago informed the Blagodat-Kushvinsky authority, from which they were occupied.

— Pallas Peter Simon

In literature, the first descriptions of mountain Kachkanar were made in 1770 by the academician Peter Simon Pallas in the book "Travels through the southern Provinces of the Russian Empire" (Russian: «Путешествие по разным провинциям Российского государства»). The original name of the mountain is Kushanar, the translation gives the name Keskanar. The 1811 sources also named the mountain Keskanar. In V. 2 of the Geographic-Statistical Dictionary of the Russian Empire (Russian: «Географическо-статистический словарь Российской империи») Pyotr Semyonov-Tyan-Shansky, published in 1865, two variants are given: pre-reform Russian orthography Russian: Качканаръ and (in brackets) Russian: Кесканаръ. In sources of 1910 the name Kochkanar can be found.

In 1789, Benedict Franz Johann von Herrmann described his first journey through the Urals in 1783. Describing mountain Kachkanar, he noted that on the western side of the mountain, they extracted rich ore containing 59% iron and coming to the surface over the whole area of the mountain among waste rock consisting of porphyritic rock, similar to the waste rock of the ore deposit of Vysokaya mountain. In 1837, Gustav Rose, who had not visited mountain Kachkanar, described the rock of the deposit based on three samples sent to him. He attributed the mineralogical composition of the waste rock to hypersthene.

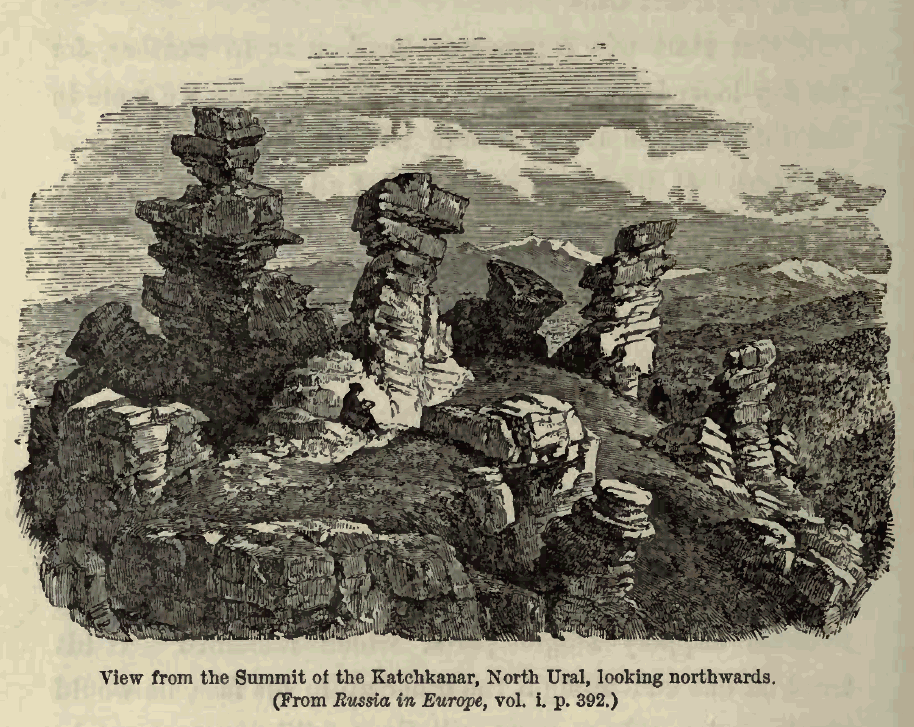
View from the Kachkanar park, North Ural

In 1849, a translation of the first volume of "The Geology of Russia in Europe and the Ural mountains" (Russian: «Геологическое описание Европейской России и хребта Уральского») was published Sir Roderick Impey Murchison, Philippe Édouard Poulletier de Verneuil and Alexander von Keyserling. The authors pointed out that most of the rocks of Kachkanar, especially at its base, consist of coarse and fine-grained white and green feldspathic diorite, the main peaks of Kachkanar are piled of angular fractured blocks, not covered with any vegetation. Researchers also pointed out veins of pure magnetic ironstone from 1 to several inches thick. Summarising, Murchison noted that the Kachkanar ore was extremely dense, malleable and refractory and that its "extraction and processing are unusually burdensome for the miner and smelter".

In 1851, Karl Christoph Gottlieb Zerrenner mentions in his work that mountain Kachkanar is surrounded by slates, the massif of the mountain itself consists of augite with magnetic ironstone, which has polar magnetism, and serpentinite. Zerrenner also mentioned a vast number of veins of magnetic ironstone, ranging in thickness from the finest vein to 10 inches, and claimed that phenocrysts of magnetic ironstone grains occur almost everywhere in the augite rock. In 1859, Eremeyev Pavel Vladimirovich in "The notes on iron ore deposits in the mining and factory dachas of the Ural Range" (Russian: «Заметки о месторождениях железных руд в горнозаводских дачах хребта Уральского») referred to the minerals of the lower slopes of the mountain to diorite, the upper slopes to dense diorite and diorite porphyry, and the summit to augite porphyry.

Mining engineer Antipov A.I. in 1860 in his description of the mines of the Bisersky plant mentions a deposit of boulder ore at the foot of the southern slope of Kachkan: "This deposit was mined as early as 1830 to extract pieces of magnetite, which were not used for smelting but were sent to gold mines, where they were used to extract ferruginous slimes from the washed gold".

On 10 August 1857, during an expedition to the Urals, mountain Kachkanar was surveyed by Ernst Reinhold von Hofmann. He followed Pallas in noting the iron-rich veins deflecting the compass arrow and the boulder-occupied space between the north and south summits. He found similarities between the hypersthene of the northern summit and the slopes in front of the Konzhakovskiy Kamen and Denezhkin Kamen stones. Hoffmann also pointed out that the bulk of the ore was contaminated with waste rock and expressed doubts about the feasibility of smelting iron-poor ore. He claimed the height of the mountain was 2,849 feet above sea level.

Sources from 1864 listed the mountain's height as 3,000 feet. The viscosity and refractoriness of the ores were also mentioned, which was the reason for the declining interest in the deposit.

In the following years, the greatest contribution to the geological study of this area was made by Alexander Karpinsky (1869), Krasnopolsky Aleksandr Aleksandrovich (1890) and especially Vysotsky Nikolai Konstantinovich (1913), who published his monograph on it — "Deposits of platinum of the Isovsky and Nizhny Tagil district in the Urals" (Russian: Месторождения платины Исовского и Нижнетагильского района на Урале). In 1869, Karpinsky classified the Kachkanar ores as a mixture of pyroxenes (augites), magnetic ironstone and greenish-white saussurite and called them augite gabbro. Due to the low iron content, the ores were of little interest to industry, and detailed exploration was not carried out here for a long time. There are also references in the literature to iron-rich Kachkanar ores used as magnets to separate gold and platinum from iron impurities.

In the dachas of Goroblagodatsky plants magnetic ironstones are laid down by whole mountains, for example: Blagodat, Kachkanar, Sinyaya, Malaya Blagodat. Kachkanar ore contains from 52 to 58 % of iron and has strong magnetic properties, representing excellent natural magnets, which are used by local gold miners to purify gold slurry from iron particles.

In the report on the results of the Ural Expedition in 1899 Dmitri Mendeleev noted that the mountain Kachkanar deposit, which is in relative proximity to the Kushvinsky and Nizhneturinsky plants, is not developed, while the deposits of Vysokaya mountain and Blagodat mountains are exploited in significant volumes.

The beginning of systematic exploration of Kachkanar's ore deposits under the leadership of I. I. Malyshev and P. G. Panteleev dates back to the early 1930s, when small exploration works were conducted. At the same time, research and development work began on the mineral processing of the Kachkanar ores and agglomeration of minerals of iron-vanadium concentrate, as a result of which the principal technical possibility of mining and processing of ores with low iron content was proved. In 1946-1953 the trust "Uralchermetrazvedka" (Russian: «Уралчерметразведка») carried out a detailed exploration of the Kachkanar group of iron ore deposits. In 1959–1966, additional exploration of the Gusevogorsky deposit was carried out, and from 1976 to 1977, additional exploration of the Kachkanarsky deposit itself.

Development of titanomagnetite ores of the Kachkanar group was started in 1957 on the initiative of Ural mining industry leaders M. M. Gorshnylekov, V. I. Dovgomys and I. M. Delikhov, and leading specialists of "Uralgiprorud" (Russian: «Уралгипроруд») (L. I. Tsymbalenko), "Uralmekhanobr" (Russian: «Уралмеханобр») (G. I. Sladkov) and geological department (K. E. Kozhevnikov, M. I. Aleshin). In the same year, the town of Kachkanar was founded to the south-east of the mountain's summit. The Gusevogorsky deposit is currently being developed by the Kachkanarsky Mining and Processing Combine. Preparatory work at the Sobstvenno-Kachkanarskoye field started in 2019.

== Conflict between the Buddhist community and Kachkanarsky Mining and Processing Combine ==
On the northeastern slope of the mountain, the Buddhist monastery Shedrub Ling was founded in 1995, where a small community carried out their practices.

In 2006, Kachkanarsky Mining and Processing Combine received a licence to develop the Sobstvenno-Kachkanarskoye deposit, directly represented by mountain Kachkanar. In 2013, a positive conclusion of the state expert review of the development project was obtained. At the same time, the monastery turned out to be in the mining zone. The court recognised the buildings of Buddhists on the mountain as illegal and subject to demolition.

In 2019, an agreement was reached to relocate the community to the Kosya settlement at the foot of the mountain, with the condition of maintaining periodic access to the monastery on top of the mountain.

At the end of March 2022, the buildings of the monastery were dismantled by Kachkanarsky Mining and Processing Combine, the religious structures were preserved.

== In literature ==
Alexander Nikolayevich Engelhardt, in the seventh letter of the series "Letters from the Village", mentions climbing Kachkanar.

== Gallery ==
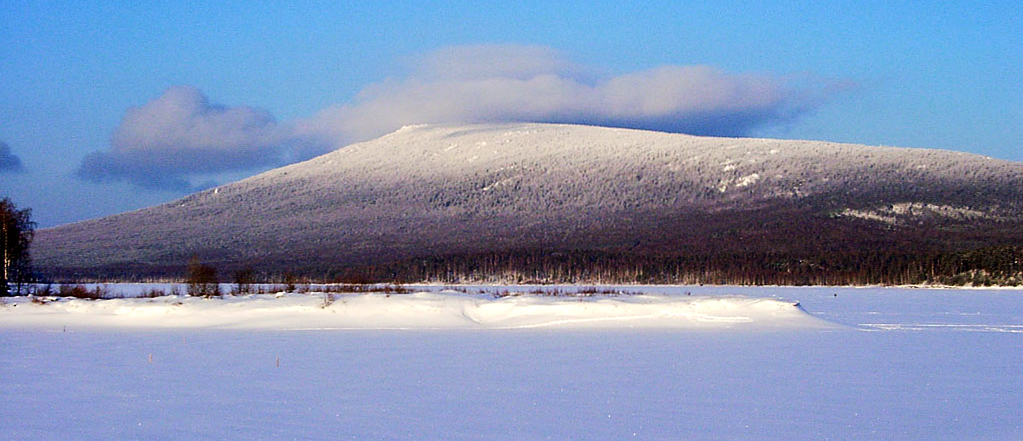
The mountain in winter

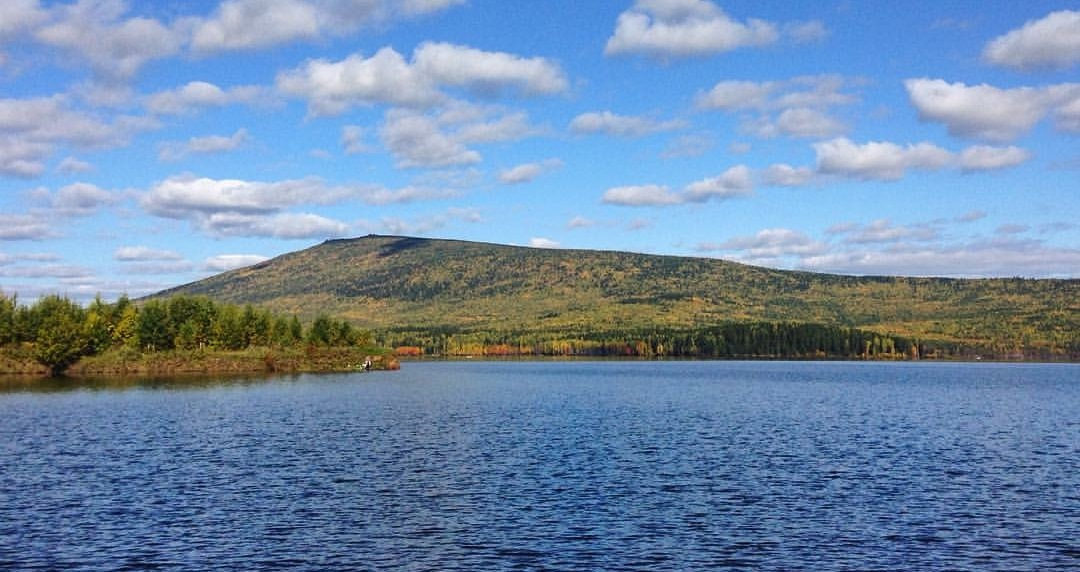
The mountain in autumn

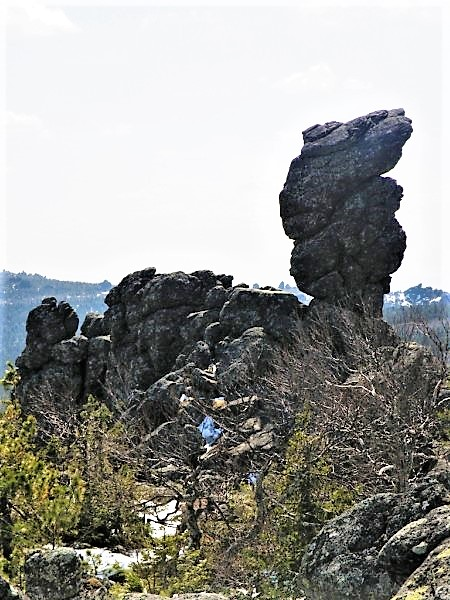
Camel Rock

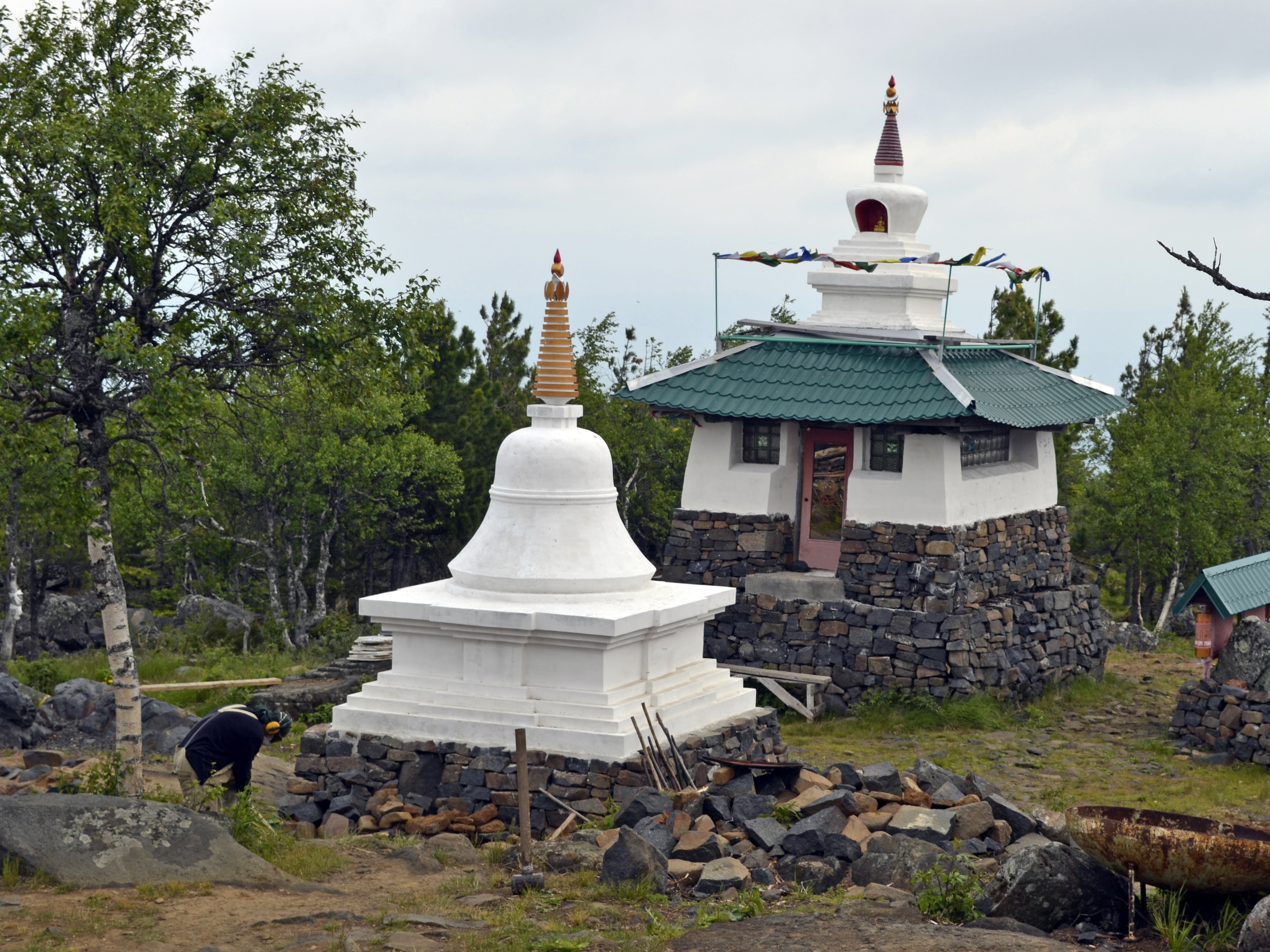
Stupas of Shedrub Ling Buddhist Temple

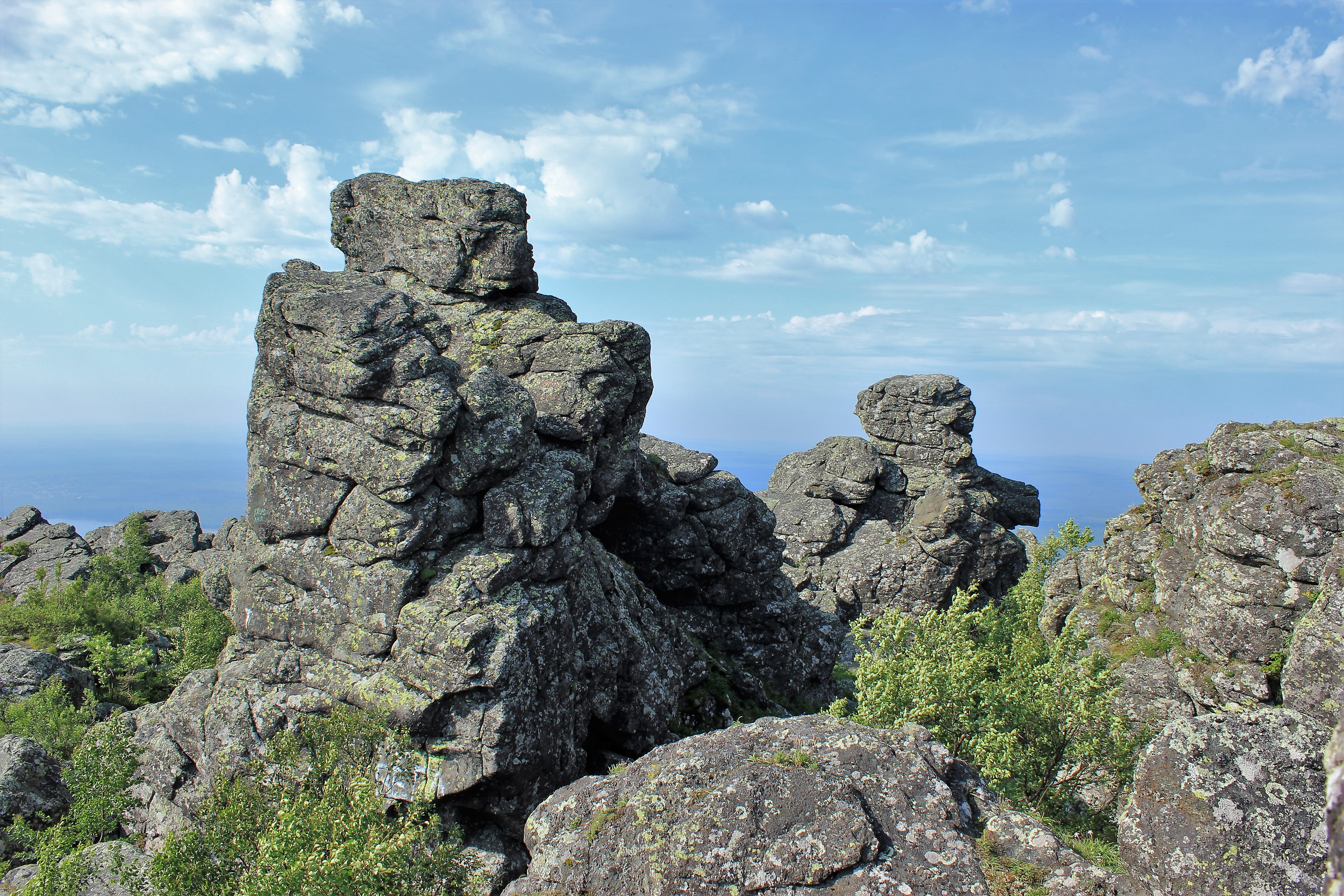
Buttes on the top of the mountain

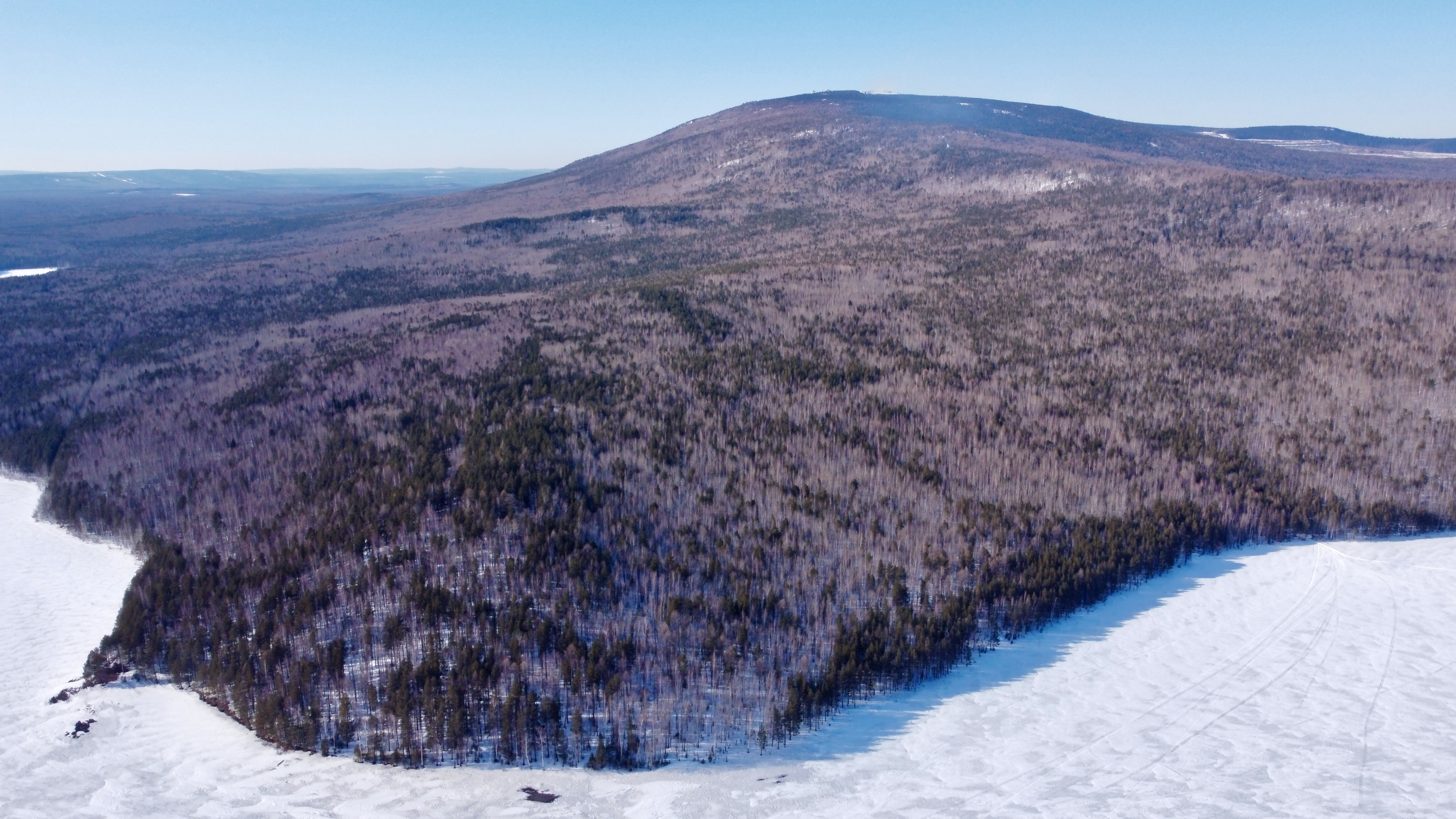
Southeast slope

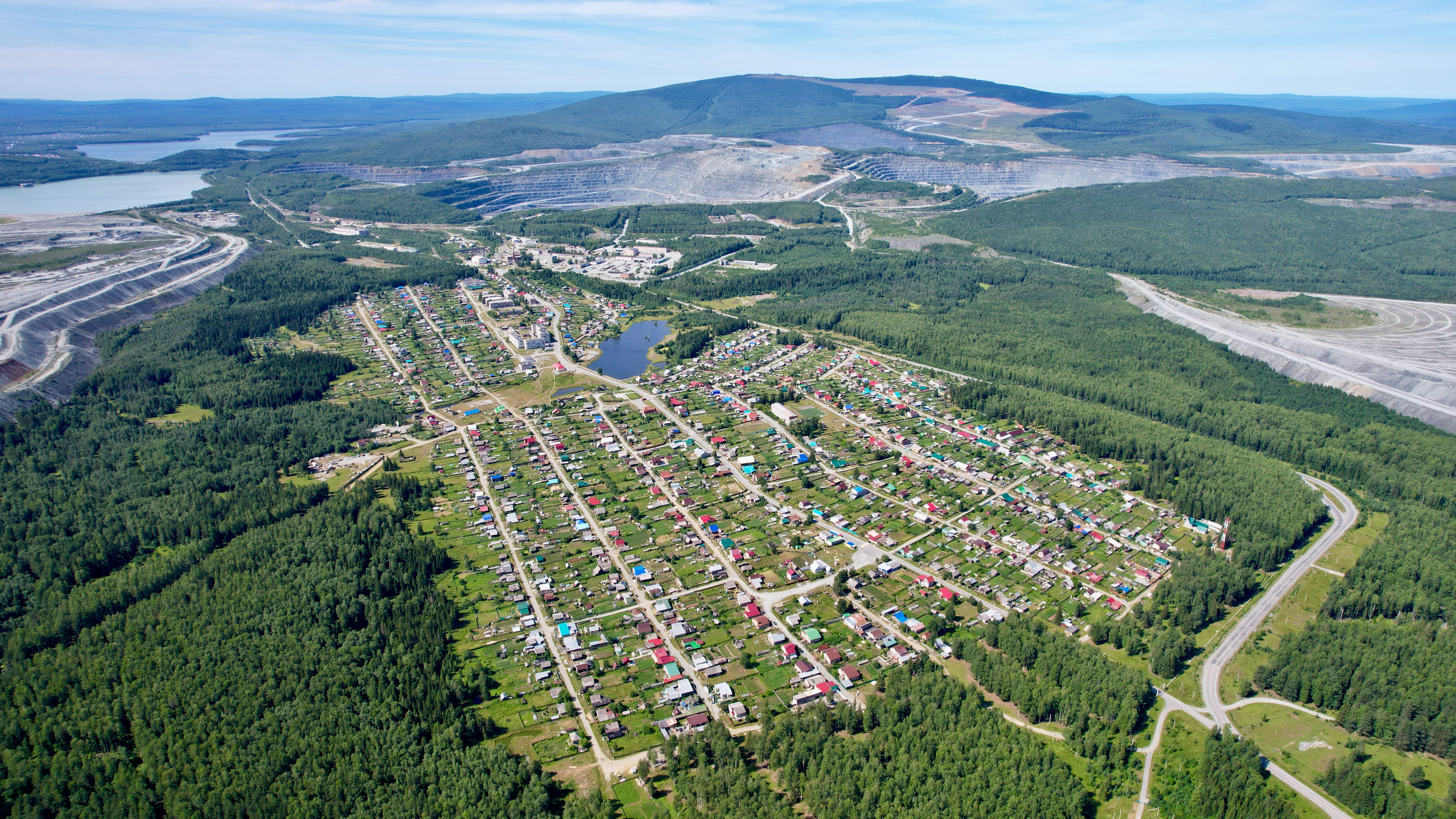
View from the town of Valerianovsk

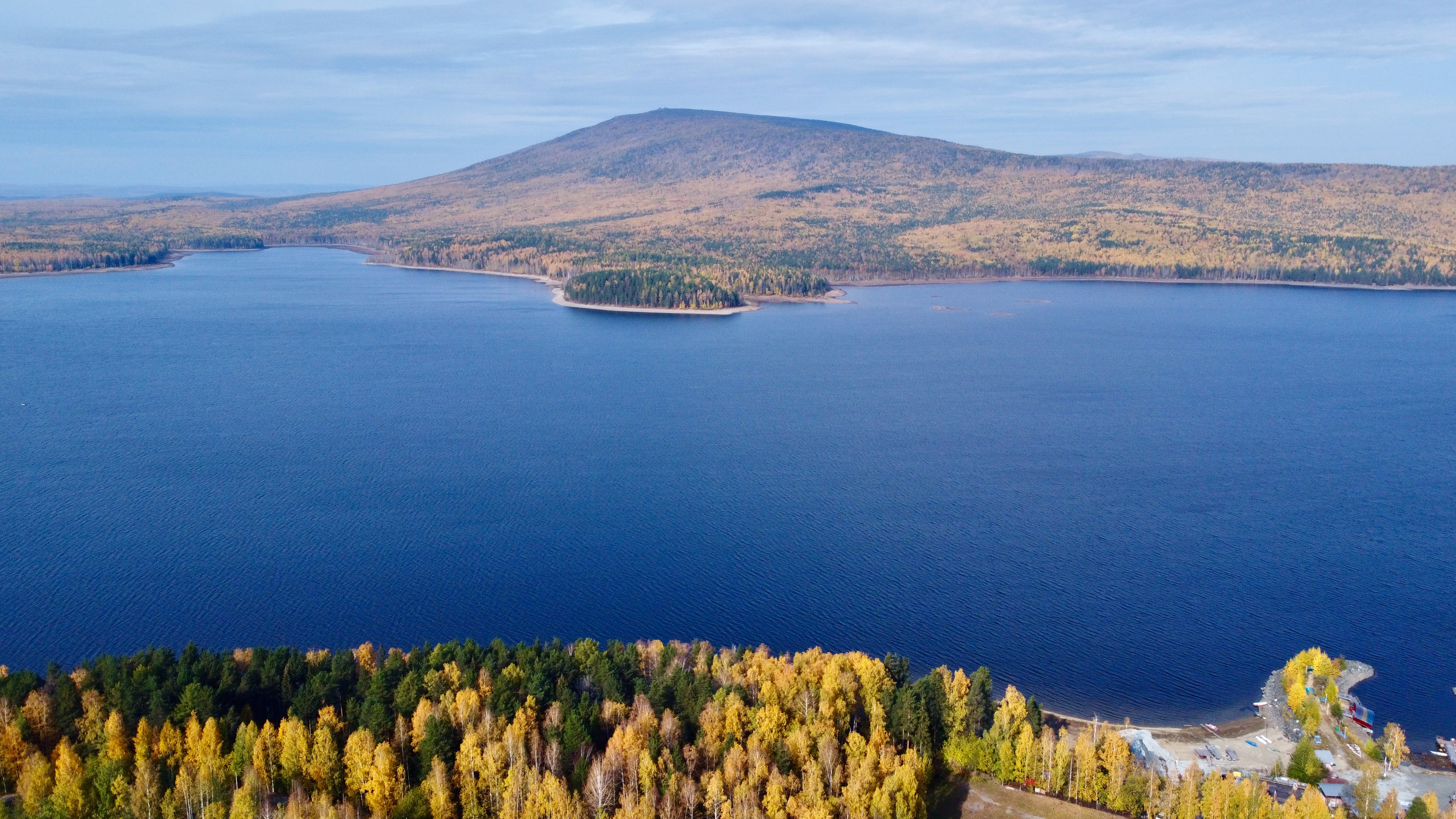
View of the pond and the mountain

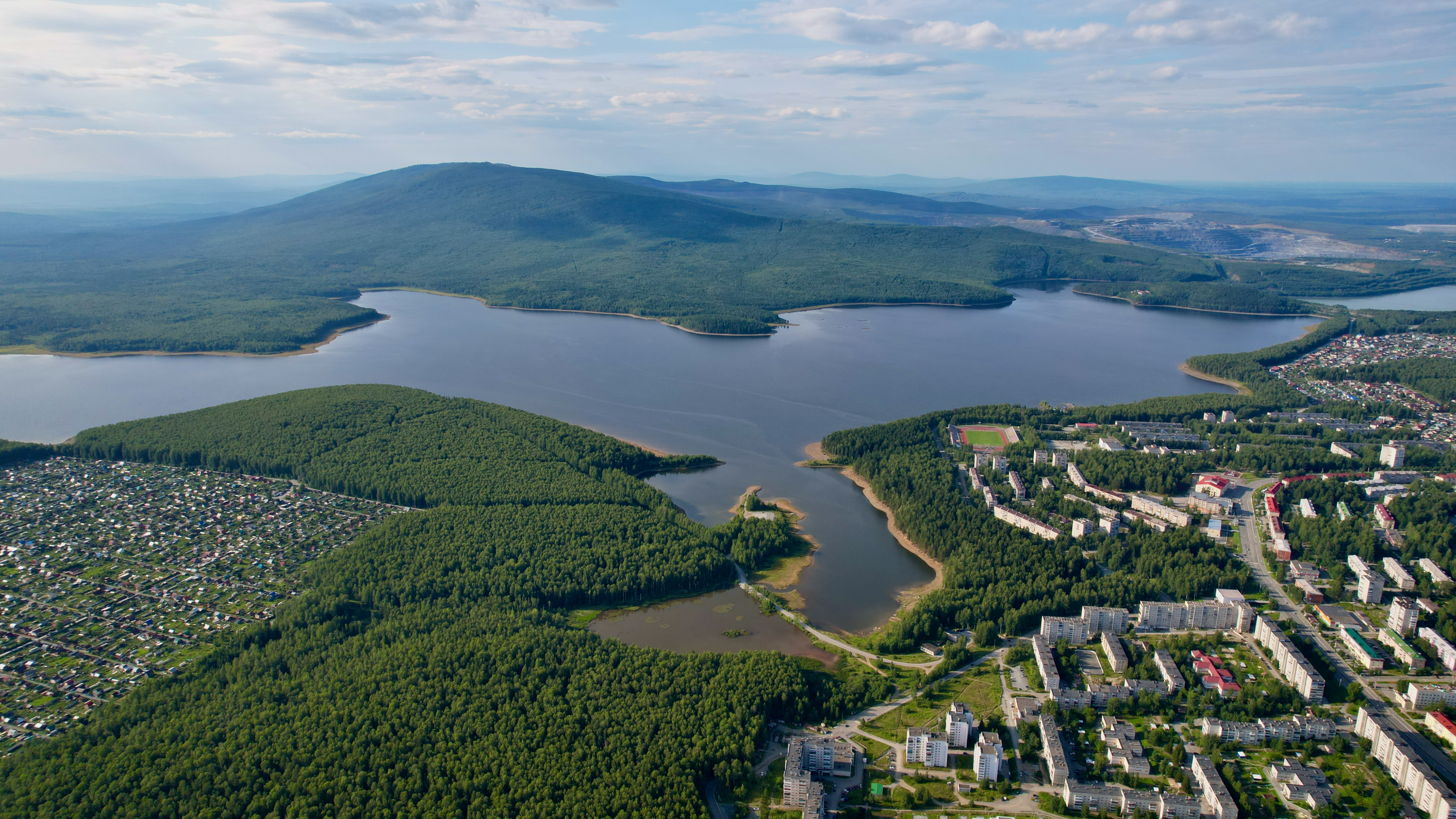
View from height

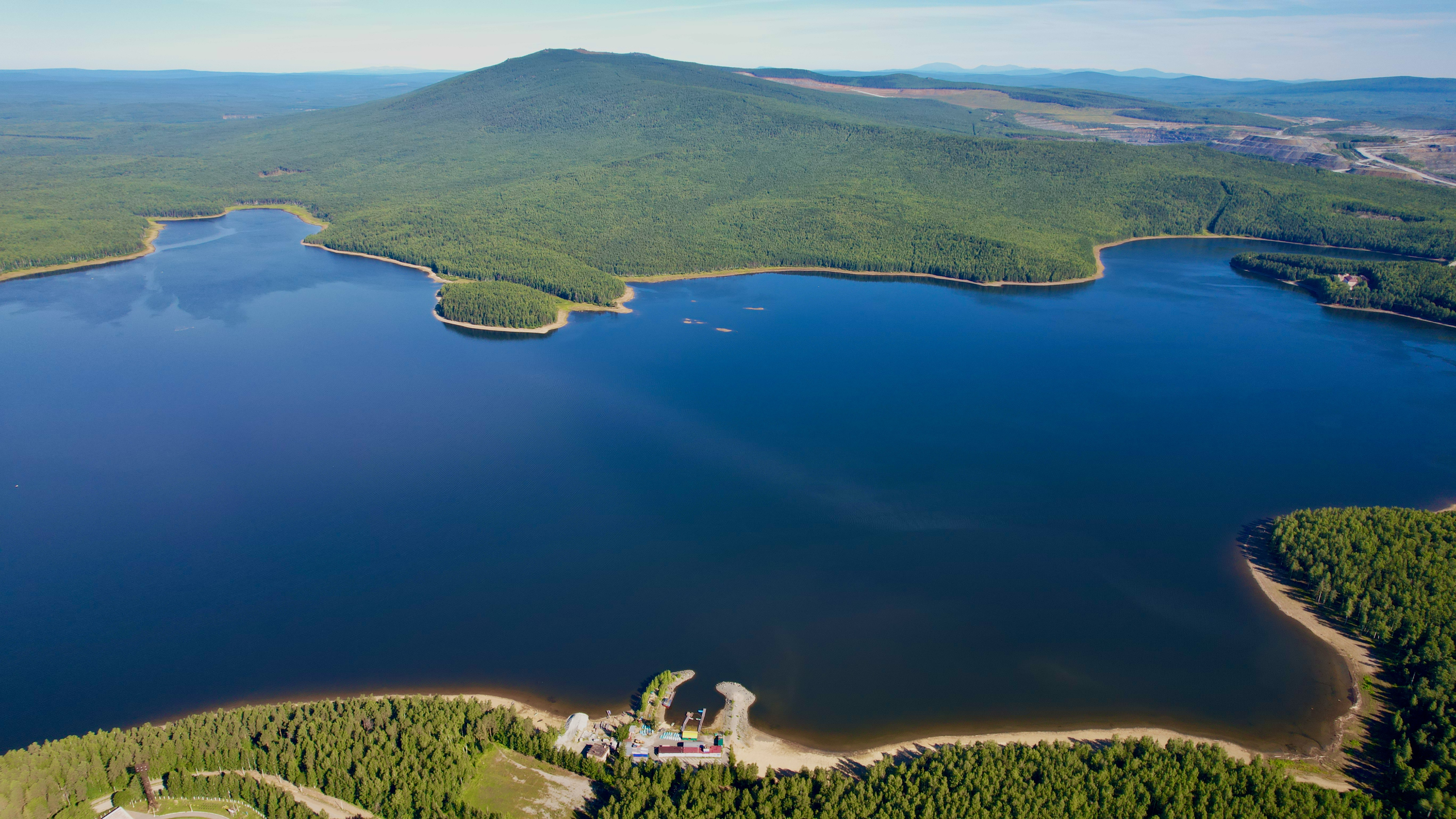
View from height

== See also ==
- Sverdlovsk Oblast
- Kachkanar
- Ural Mountains

== Bibliography ==
- Тамплон, Е. Ф., ed. (2007). Город юности Качканар (PDF). Anniversary edition. Yekaterinbug: ООО «Издательство КВАДРАТ». p. 108. ISBN 978-5-91357-002-4. Archived from the original (PDF) on 2021-10-10.
- Доброхотов, Ф. П. (1917). Урал северный, средний, южный. Petrograd: Изд-во В. А. Суворина.
- Довгопол, В. И. (1959). Проблемы Качканара: по материалам конференции по комплексному использованию качканарских титаномагнетитовых руд. Sverdlovsk: Центральное бюро технической информации.
- Барбот де Марни, Е. Н. (1902). "Гора Качканар и её месторождения магнитного железняка". Горный журнал (6): 244–246. ISSN 0017-2278. Archived from the original on 2021-01-09.
- Алексеев, В. В., ed. (2000). "Качканарский горнообогатительный комбинат" (PDF). Уральская историческая энциклопедия (2nd, revised and expanded ed.). Yekaterinburg: Издательство Академкнига; УрО РАН. pp. 261–262. ISBN 5-93472-019-8. Archived from the original (PDF) on 2021-10-20.
- Ерёмин, Н. Я.; Грачёв, Н. С. (1976). Новь горняков Качканара. Sverdlovsk: Средне-Уральское книжное издательство. pp. 7–8.
- Медведев, Ю. П., ed. (1999). Качканар. Yekaterinburg: Издательство Уральского университета. ISBN 5-7525-0718-9.
- Щуровский, Г. Е. (1841). Уральский хребет в физико-географическом, геогностическом и минералогическом отношениях. Moscow: Университетская типография. pp. 355–356.
