= Vysokaye (disambiguation) =

Vysokaye (Belarusian: Высокае), rural localities in Belarus, may refer to:

- Vysokaye, Byaroza District, Brest Region, a village
- Vysokaye, Kamenets District, Brest Region, a town
- Vysokaye, Malaryta District, Brest Region, a village
- Vysokaye, Pinsk District, Brest Region, a village
- Vysokaye, Stolin District, Brest Region, a village
- Vysokaye, Khoiniki District, Gomel Region, a village
- Vysokaye, Rahachow District, Gomel Region, a village
- Vysokaye, Krupki District, Minsk Region, a village
- Vysokaye, Smalyavichy District, Minsk Region, a village
- Vysokaye, Valozhyn District, Minsk Region, a village
- Vysokaye, Chavusy District, Mogilev Region, a village
- Vysokaye, Kastsyukovichy District, Mogilev Region, a village
- Vysokaye, Klimavichy District, Mogilev Region, a agrotown
- Vysokaye, Krychaw District, Mogilev Region, a village
- Vysokaye (agrotown), Orsha District, Vitebsk Region, a agrotown
- Vysokaye (settlement), Orsha District, Vitebsk Region, a settlement

== See also ==
- Vysokoye (disambiguation)
- Vysoke (disambiguation)
