= Vysoke =

Vysoke (Ukrainian: Високе, lit. 'tall, high'), rural localities in Ukraine, may refer to:

- Vysoke, Nizhyn Raion, Chernihiv Oblast, a village in Nizhyn Raion
- Vysoke, Krynychky Raion, Dnipropetrovsk Oblast, a village
- Vysoke, Nikopol Raion, Dnipropetrovsk Oblast, a village
- Vysoke, Tomakivka Raion, Dnipropetrovsk Oblast, a village
- Vysoke, Donetsk Oblast
- Vysoke, Kyiv Oblast, a village
- Vysoke, Hrebinka Raion, Poltava Oblast, a village
- Vysoke, Lokhvytsia Raion, Poltava Oblast, a village
- Vysoke, Pyriatyn Raion, Poltava Oblast, a village
- Vysoke, Zinkiv Raion, Poltava Oblast, a village
- Vysoke, Kherson Oblast, a village in Beryslav Raion
- Vysoke, Krasnopillia Raion, Sumy Oblast, a village
- Vysoke, Okhtyrka Raion, Sumy Oblast, a village
- Vysoke, Vinnytsia Oblast, a village
- Vysoke, Volyn Oblast, a village
- Vysoke, Melitopol Raion, Zaporizhzhia Oblast, a village
- Vysoke, Mykhailivka Raion, Zaporizhzhia Oblast, a village
- Vysoke, Sumy Raion, Sumy Oblast, a village

== See also ==
- Vysoké
- Vysokoye (disambiguation)
- Vysokaye (disambiguation)
