= Kachkanar =

Town in Sverdlovsk Oblast, Russia

Kachkanar Качканар
- Town
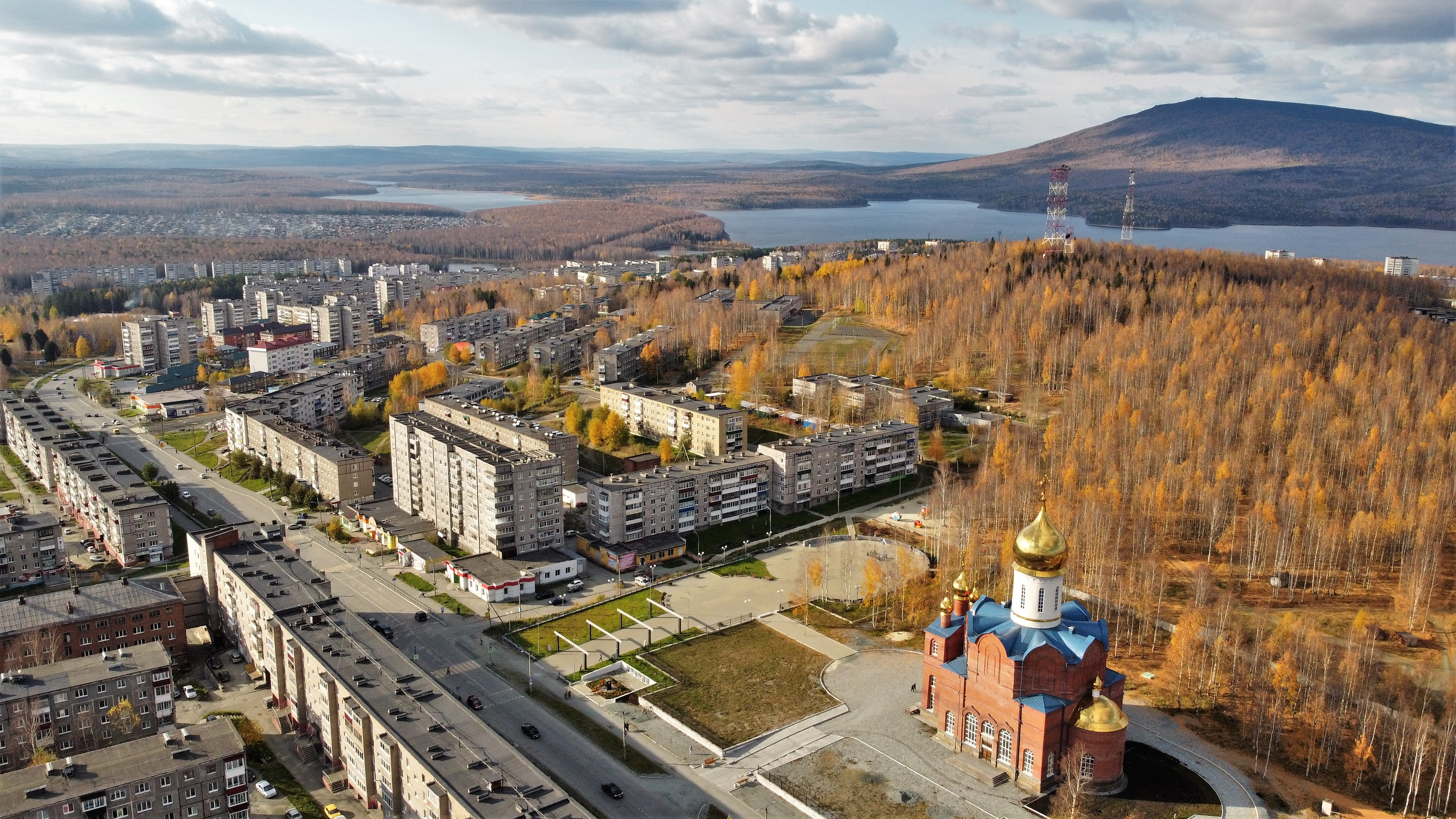
- Aerial view

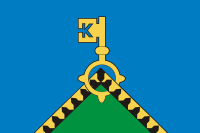
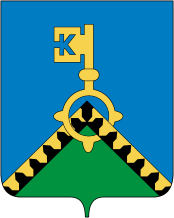
- Flag Coat of arms
- Interactive map of Kachkanar
- Location of Kachkanar Kachkanar (Sverdlovsk Oblast)
- Coordinates: 58°42′N 59°29′E
- Country: Russia
- Federal subject: Sverdlovsk Oblast
- Founded: 1957
- Elevation: 330 m (1,080 ft)

Population (2010 Census)
  - Total: 41,426
  - Estimate (2025): 36,252 (−12.5%)

Administrative status
  - Subordinated to: Town of Kachkanar
  - Capital of: Town of Kachkanar

Municipal status
  - Urban okrug: Kachkanarsky Urban Okrug
  - Capital of: Kachkanarsky Urban Okrug
- Time zone: UTC+5 (MSK+2)
- Postal codes: 624350, 624351, 624354, 624356, 624357
- OKTMO ID: 65743000001
- Website: www.admkgo.ru

Kachkanar (Russian: Качкана́р) is a town in Sverdlovsk Oblast, Russia, located between the Isa and Vyya Rivers in the Tura River's basin, 205 kilometers (127 mi) north of Yekaterinburg, the administrative center of the oblast. Population: 41,426 (2010 census); 44,664 (2002 census); 48,251 (1989 Soviet census). The town of Kachkanar is located at the foot of mountain Kachkanar.

== Administrative and municipal status ==
Within the framework of the administrative divisions, it is, together with two rural localities, incorporated as the Town of Kachkanar—an administrative unit with the status equal to that of the districts. As a municipal division, the Town of Kachkanar is incorporated as Kachkanarsky Urban Okrug.

== Economy and transportation ==
The town is served by Kachkanar railway station, connected with a 44-kilometer (27 mi) long branch line to the Perm–Nizhny Tagil–Yekaterinburg main railway line. There is an open-pit mine to the north.

== Twin towns and sister cities ==
Kachkanar is a sister city of:

- Sëlva, Italy
- Maladzyechna, Belarus
