= Moritz von Engelhardt =

Baltic German geologist (1779–1842)

Otto Moritz (I) Ludwig von Engelhardt
- Born: 8 December [O.S. 27 November] 1778; Wieso Manor, Wieso, Kreis Jerwen, Governorate of Estonia, Russian Empire (in present-day Viisu, Estonia)
- Died: 10 February [O.S. 29 January] 1842 (aged 62); Dorpat, Kreis Dorpat, Governorate of Livonia, Russian Empire (present-day Tartu, Estonia)
- Education: University of Leipzig, University of Göttingen, Imperial University of Dorpat
- Scientific career
- Fields: Mineralogy
- Workplaces: Imperial University of Dorpat
- Notable students: Germain Henri Hess

Otto Moritz (I) Ludwig von Engelhardt (9 December [O.S. 27 November] 1778 - 10 February [O.S. 29 January] 1842) was a Baltic German mineralogist. He was a member of the Engelhardt family.

== Biography ==
He was born in 1778 in his family's manor Wieso an estate in Viisu, Estonia. He studied Physics and Chemistry at the University of Leipzig (1796-1797) and at University of Göttingen (1797-1798). In company with Karl von Raumer he traveled through central Europe and England, and in 1811 he undertook a journey with Friedrich Parrot through the Crimea and the Caucasus. The results of his extensive tour through Finland in 1818 were published in the work entitled Geognostischer Umriss von Finland (“Geological sketch of Finland”), vol. i. of an elaborately projected Darstellung aus dem Felsgebäude Russlands (“Representative rock constructions in Russia,” 1821).

From 1820 to 1841 he was professor of mineralogy at the Imperial University of Dorpat, and in 1826 he entered upon those extensive travels through Russia in the course of which he discovered the vast deposits of gold, platinum, and diamonds described in his famous reports published at Riga in 1828 and 1830.

His other literary productions include a description of his first extensive tour, published by him jointly with his companion Raumer in the works respectively entitled Geognostische Versuche (“Geological experiments,” 1816) and Geognostische Umrisse (“Geological sketches,” 1817).

== Personal life ==
Engelhardt married two times. His first wife Mary Pierson of Balmadis (1778-1803) died young at the age of 25 and later he married Catharina Elisabeth Johanna von Müller (1785-1868). He had 6 children in total, one daughter, Alexandra Eveline (1801-1874), with his first wife and 5 more (Maria Charlotte Wilhelmine (1813-1887) Auguste Dorothea "Emma" (1814-1896), Gotthard Gustav Rudolph (1816-1850), Otto Roderich (1819-1870), Meta Alexandra (1821-1825), Gustav Moritz Constantin "Moritz II" (1828-1881) ) with the second wife. His son, Moritz II became Professor of Theologie at the University of Dorpat.

== Sources ==
- "Энгельгардт, Мориц (минералог)" . Brockhaus and Efron Encyclopedic Dictionary (in Russian). 1906.
