= Kachkanar railway station =

Railway station

Kachkanar Качканар
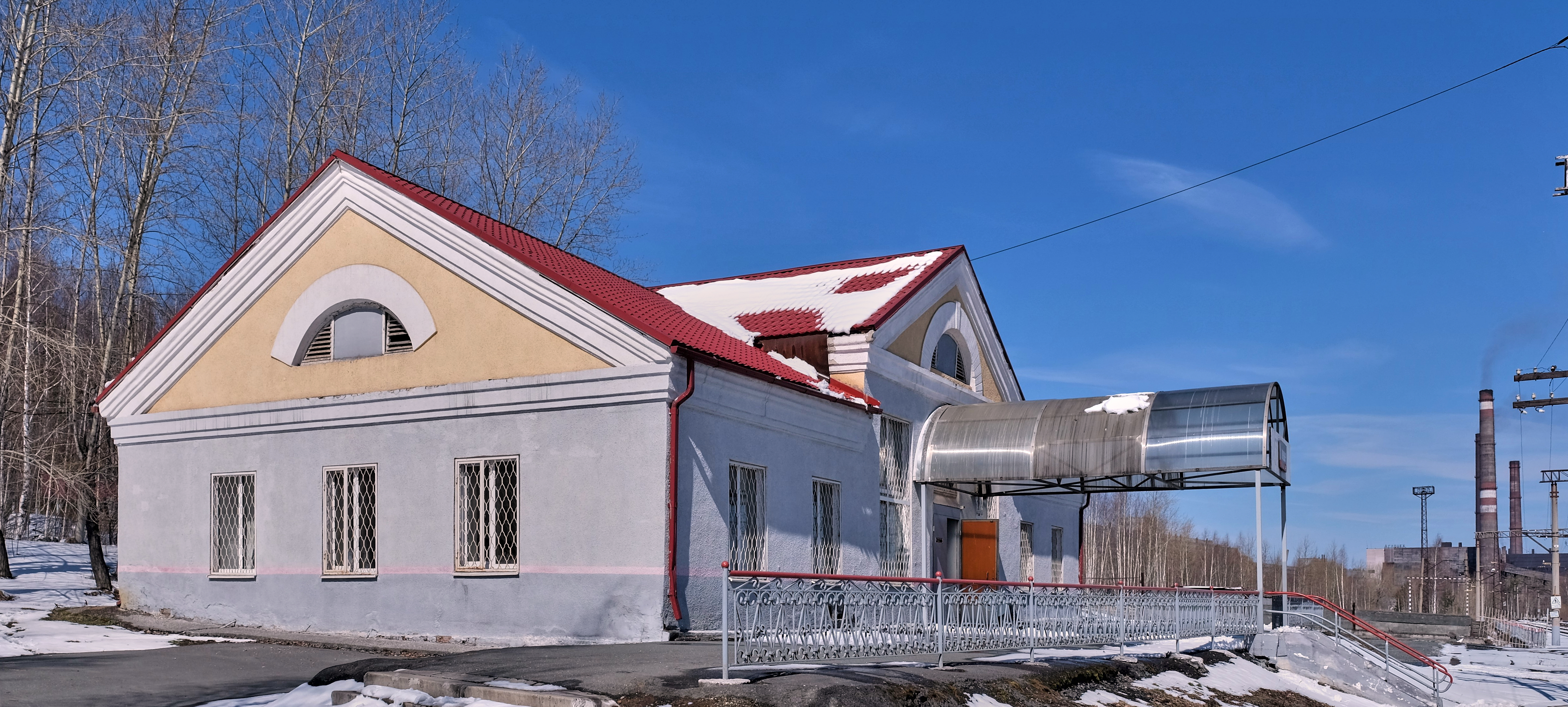

General information
- Location: Kachkanar, Sverdlovsk Oblast, Russia
- Coordinates: 58°42′01.0″N 59°30′32″E
- Platforms: 1
- Tracks: 25

Other information
- Station code: 773008

History
- Opened: 7 November 1958
Location

Kachkanar railway station (Russian: станция Качканар) is a railway station located in Kachkanar, Sverdlovsk Oblast, Russia. It is part of the Sverdlovsk Railway, on a branch line that joins the line from Yevropeyskaya railway station and Shuvakish railway station at Aziatskaya railway station.

== History ==
Work began in summer 1956 to connect the under-construction Kachkanar Mining and Processing Plant and the developing settlement of Kachkanar, to the existing railway line 46 km (28.6 mi) away at Aziatskaya railway station, in the village of Aziatskaya. Komsomol brigades were used to build the infrastructure, laying tracks with tractors and horses. The first steam locomotive arrived at the station on 7 November 1958. On 16 November 1958 Sverdlovsktransstroy ordered the implementation of a temporary operation department for the developing line.

The railway station buildings were opened in April 1960, and included a control room and utility rooms, with houses built nearby along Oktyabrskaya Street to accommodate railway workers. By this time the line reached from Kachkanar to Chekmen railway station. From there trains bound in the direction of Aziatskaya traversed a temporary section on the Aziatskaya - Kherbet-Uralsky section, 9 km (5.6 mi) from Aziatskaya. The facilities and tracks at Kachkanar were completed by April 1962, with the station building housing a ticket office and the premises of the station workers. The Aziatskaya-Kachkanar line was finally completed and entered operation on 2 April 1962.

== Operations ==
Kachkanar is a cargo and passenger station. Most cargo from Kachkanar is sinter and pellets for delivery to Smychka railway station to supply the Nizhniy Tagil Iron and Steel Works. Kachkanar station and the neighbouring station Kachkanar-Sorting Station provides some 30% of the total volume of cargo loading of Nizhny Tagil branch of the Sverdlovsk railway.

Passenger transportation is by a twice-daily suburban train to Nizhny Tagil railway station.

== Gallery ==
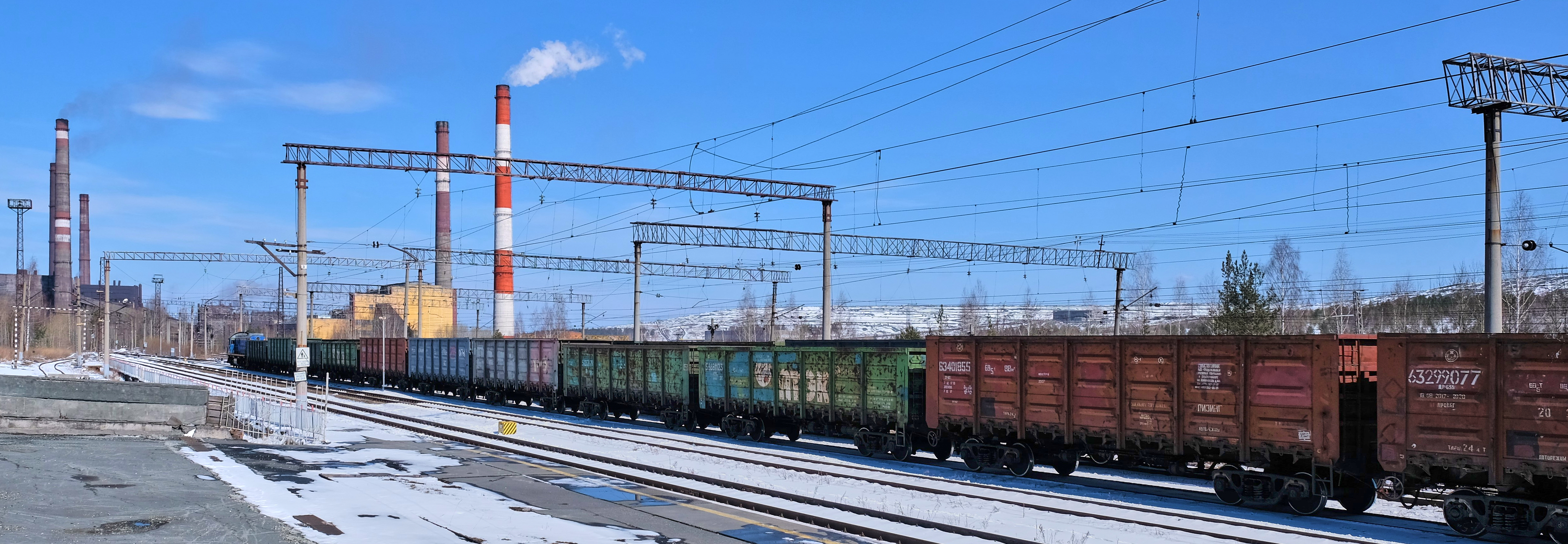
Cars on the station's tracks

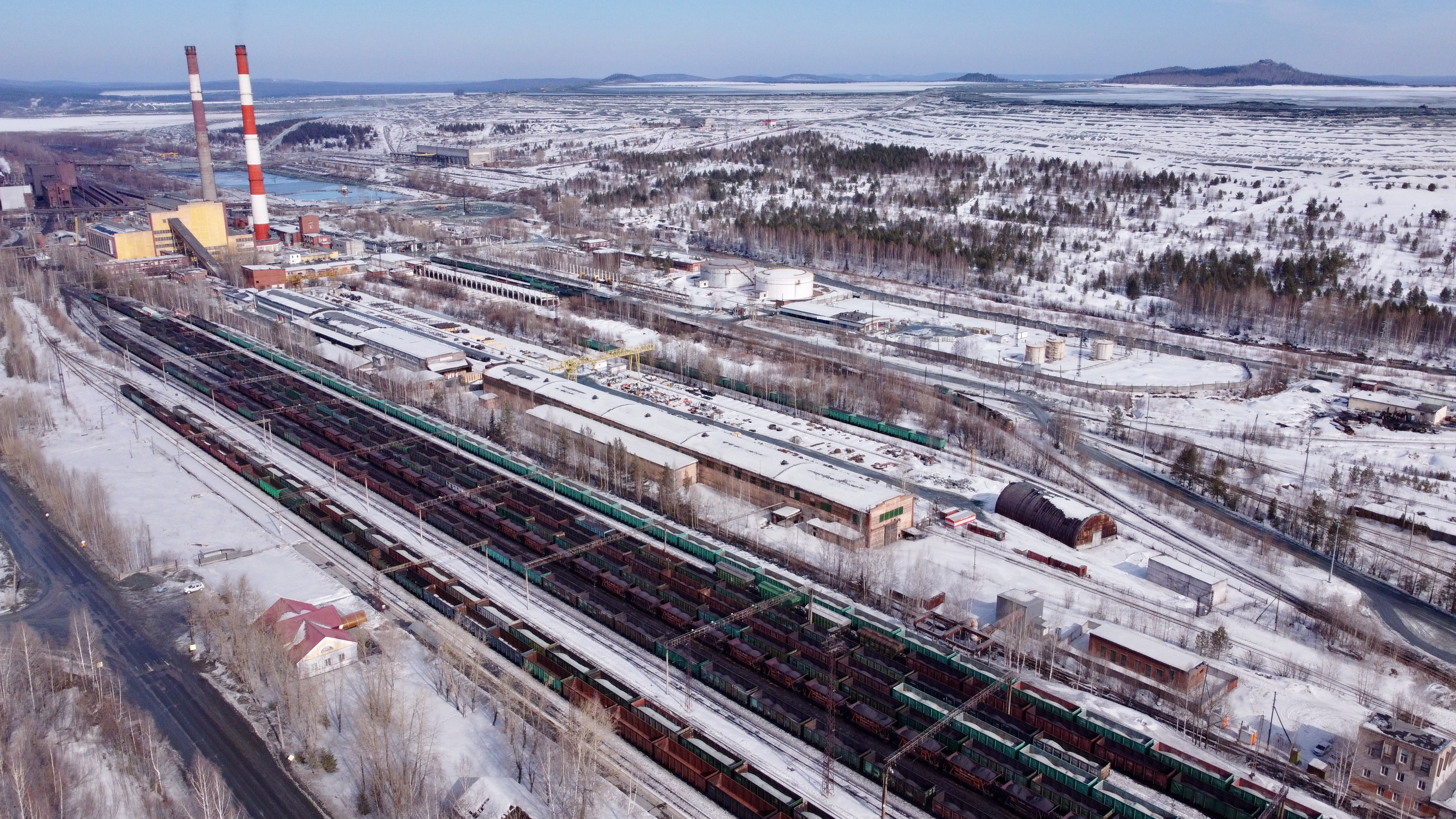
View from above (in the background is the sludge storage facility Kachkanarsky Mining and Processing Plant)

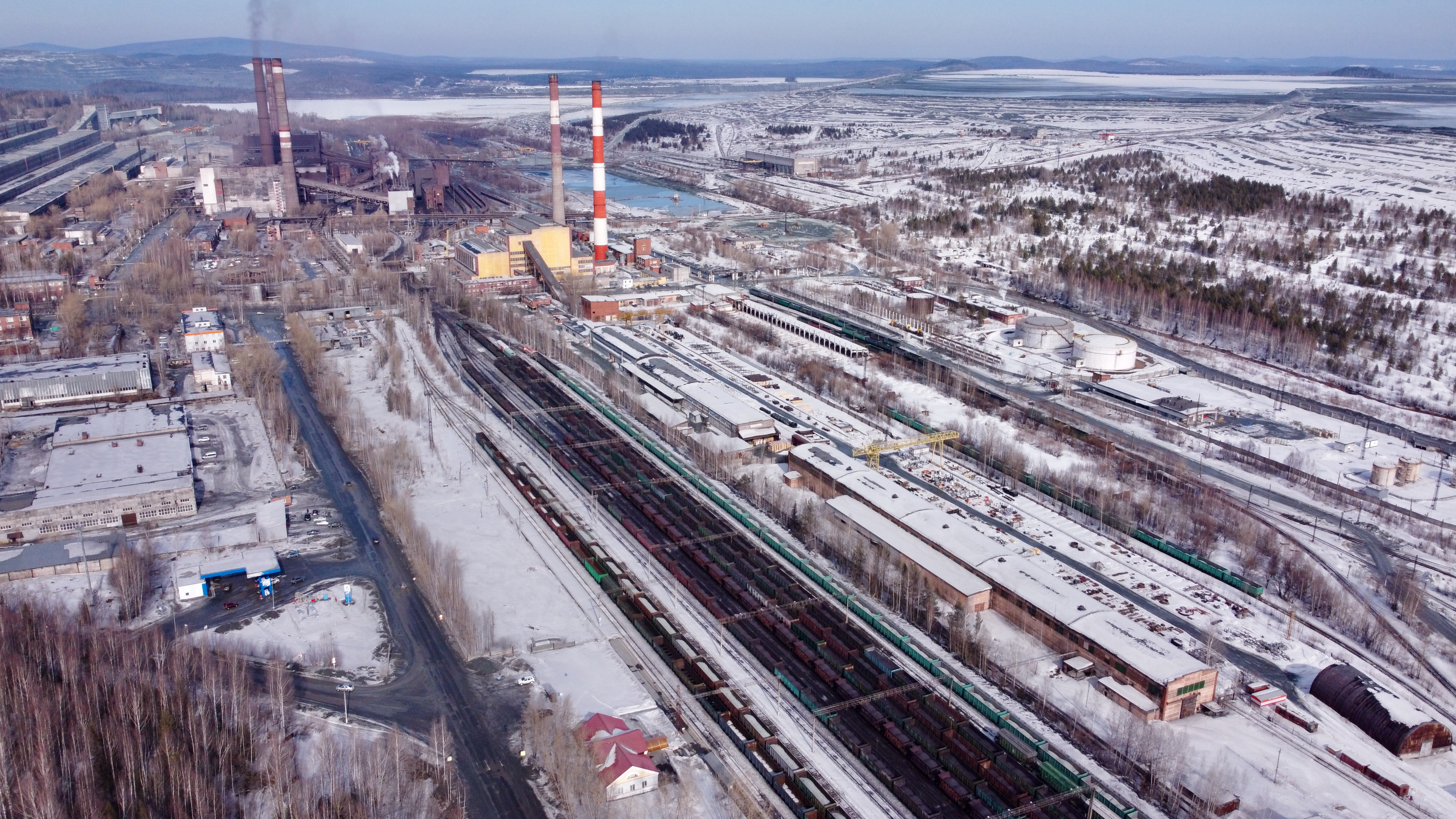
View from above (in the background is the Kachkanarskaya combined heat and power station)
