= Hofmann Island =

Island in Franz Josef Land, Russia

Coordinates: 81°17′N 60°13′E

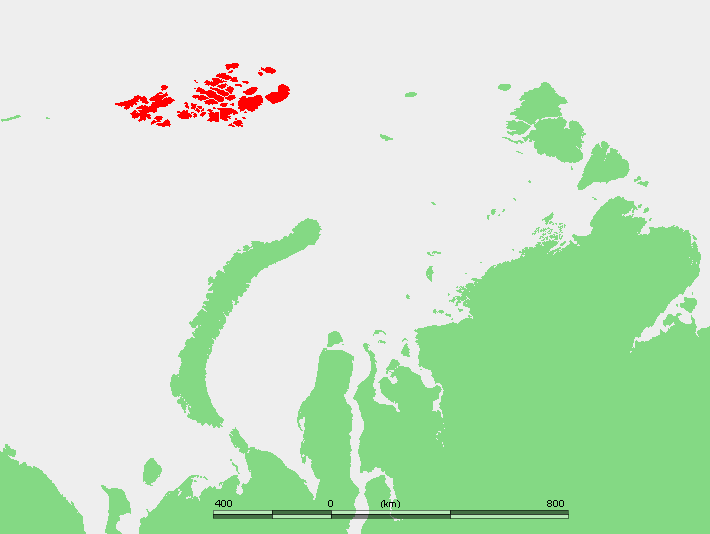
Location of the Franz Josef Archipelago

Hofmann Island (Остров Гофмана; Ostrov Gofmana) is an island in Franz Josef Land, Russian Arctic.

Hofmann Island is 13 kilometres (8 miles) long and its maximum width is 5 km (3 miles). It is located 8.6 km (5.3 mi) further east from Rainer Island and it has three small islets on its northeastern shores.

Hofmann island is the site of a snow runway.

This island is said to have been named after Freiherr Leopold von Hoffmann, a member of the Austro-Hungarian North Pole Society, though a differing claim attributes the namesake to be Russian geologist Ernst Reinhold von Hofmann.

Northeast of Hofmann Island runs a 45-kilometre-broad (28 mi) channel known as Proliv Severo Vostochnyy, beyond which lies Belaya Zemlya.
