= Vysoky, Olkhovatsky District, Voronezh Oblast =

Vysoky Высокий
- Khutor
- Location within Voronezh Oblast Location within Russia
- Coordinates: 50°28′N 39°17′E
- Country: Russia
- Region: Voronezh Oblast
- District: Olkhovatsky District
- Time zone: UTC+3:00

Vysoky (Russian: Высокий) is a rural locality (a khutor) in Karayashnikovskoye Rural Settlement, Olkhovatsky District, Voronezh Oblast, Russia. The population was 50 as of 2010.

== Geography ==
Vysoky is located 33 km north of Olkhovatka (the district's administrative centre) by road. Rybny is the nearest rural locality.
