= Vysoky, Starooskolsky District, Belgorod Oblast =

Vysoky Высокий
- Khutor
- Location within Belgorod Oblast Location within Russia
- Coordinates: 51°07′N 38°22′E
- Country: Russia
- Region: Belgorod Oblast
- District: Starooskolsky District
- Time zone: UTC+3:00

Vysoky (Russian: Высокий) is a rural locality (a khutor) in Starooskolsky District, Belgorod Oblast, Russia. The population was 91 as of 2010. There is 1 street.

== Geography ==
Vysoky is located 56 km southeast of Stary Oskol (the district's administrative centre) by road. Vladimirovka and Borovaya are the nearest rural localities.
