= Vysoké =

- Municipality
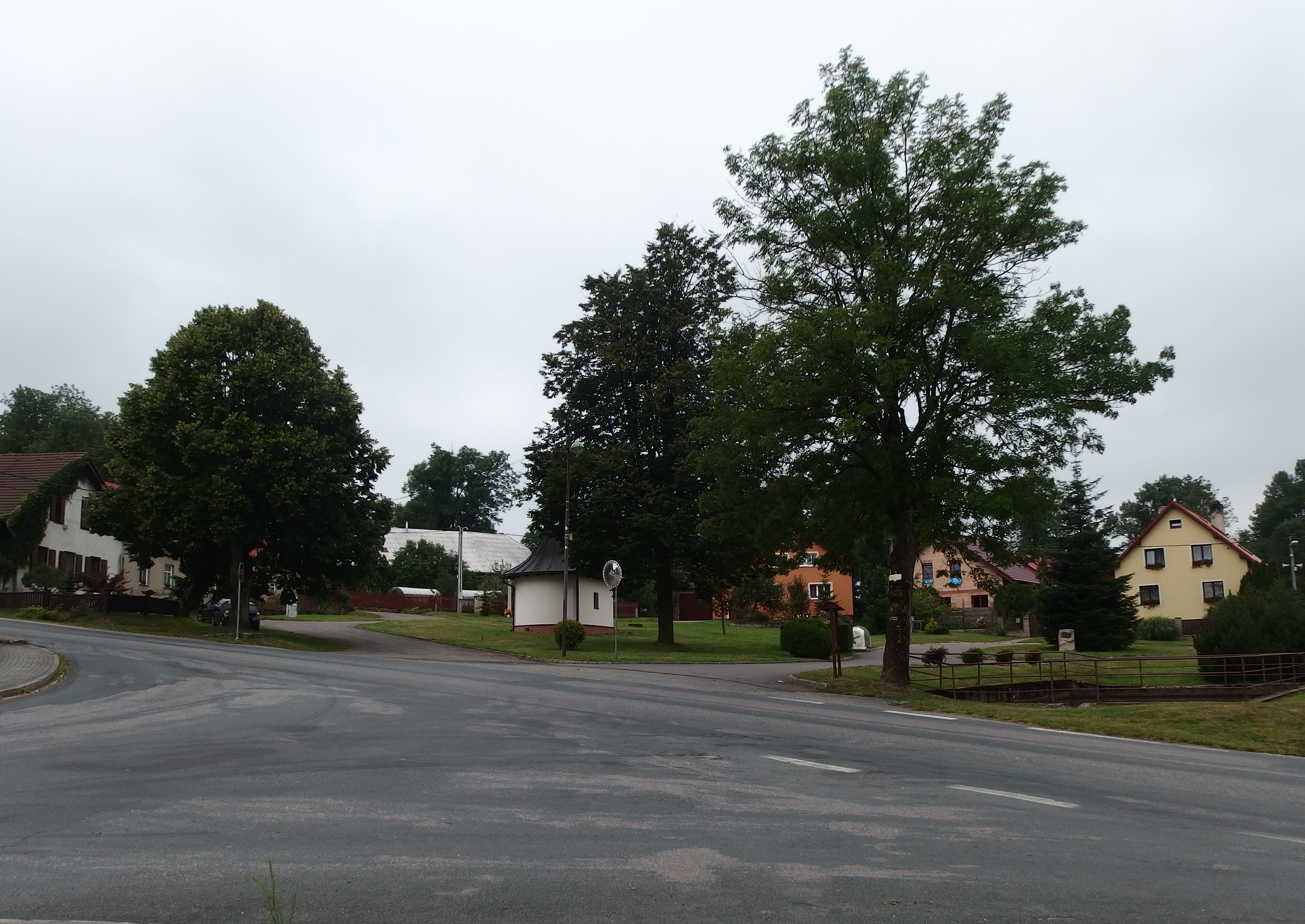
- Centre of Vysoké

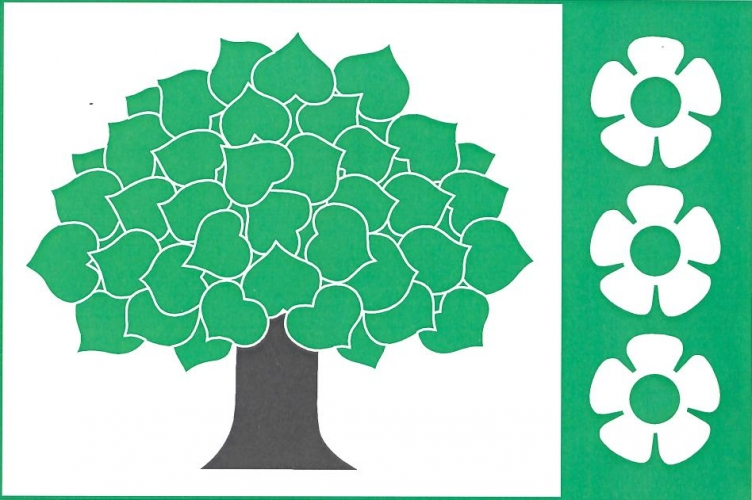
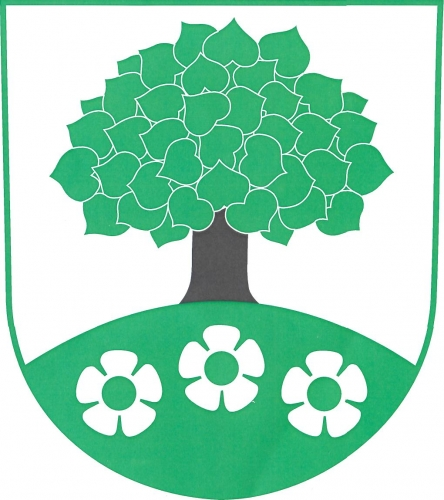
- Flag Coat of arms

- Location in the Czech Republic
- Coordinates: 49°34′55″N 15°57′55″E
- Country: Czech Republic
- Region: Vysočina
- District: Žďár nad Sázavou
- First mentioned: 1407

Area
  - Total: 6.52 km^{2} (2.52 sq mi)
- Elevation: 614 m (2,014 ft)

Population (2026-01-01)
  - Total: 211
  - Density: 32.4/km^{2} (83.8/sq mi)
- Time zone: UTC+1 (CET)
  - Summer (DST): UTC+2 (CEST)
- Postal code: 591 01
- Website: www.obecvysoke.cz

Vysoké is a municipality and village in Žďár nad Sázavou District in the Vysočina Region of the Czech Republic. It has about 200 inhabitants.

Vysoké lies approximately 3 kilometres (2 mi) north-east of Žďár nad Sázavou, 34 km (21 mi) north-east of Jihlava, and 125 km (78 mi) south-east of Prague.

== Demographics ==
Historical population
| Year | Pop. | ±% |
|---|---|---|
| 1869 | 298 | — |
| 1880 | 265 | −11.1% |
| 1890 | 288 | +8.7% |
| 1900 | 270 | −6.2% |
| 1910 | 283 | +4.8% |
| 1921 | 253 | −10.6% |
| 1930 | 223 | −11.9% |
| 1950 | 197 | −11.7% |
| 1961 | 212 | +7.6% |
| 1970 | 190 | −10.4% |
| 1980 | 190 | +0.0% |
| 1991 | 144 | −24.2% |
| 2001 | 123 | −14.6% |
| 2011 | 145 | +17.9% |
| 2021 | 194 | +33.8% |
Source: Censuses
