= Vysokaya, Vozhegodsky District, Vologda Oblast =

Vysokaya Высокая
- Village
- Location within Vologda Oblast Location within Russia
- Coordinates: 60°19′N 40°41′E
- Country: Russia
- Region: Vologda Oblast
- District: Vozhegodsky District
- Time zone: UTC+3:00

Vysokaya (Russian: Высокая) is a rural locality (a village) in Mityukovskoye Rural Settlement, Vozhegodsky District, Vologda Oblast, Russia. The population was 51 as of 2002.

== Geography ==
Vysokaya is located 70 km southeast of Vozhega (the district's administrative centre) by road. Gridinskaya is the nearest rural locality.
