= Vysokoye, Mikhaylovsky District, Amur Oblast =

Vysokoye Высокое
- Selo
- Location within Amur Oblast Location within Russia
- Coordinates: 49°35′N 129°08′E
- Country: Russia
- Region: Amur Oblast
- District: Mikhaylovsky District
- Time zone: UTC+9:00

Vysokoye (Russian: Высокое) is a rural locality (a selo) in Novochesnokovsky Selsoviet of Mikhaylovsky District, Amur Oblast, Russia. The population was 4 as of 2018. There is 1 street.

== Geography ==
Vysokoye is located between Kupriyanikha and Raychikha rivers, 39 km east of Poyarkovo (the district's administrative centre) by road. Novochesnokovo is the nearest rural locality.
