= Vysokoye, Ust-Kubinsky District, Vologda Oblast =

Vysokoye Высокое
- Settlement
- Location within Vologda Oblast Location within Russia
- Coordinates: 59°37′N 39°50′E
- Country: Russia
- Region: Vologda Oblast
- District: Ust-Kubinsky District
- Time zone: UTC+3:00

Vysokoye (Russian: Высокое) is a rural locality (a settlement) and the administrative center of Vysokovskoye Rural Settlement, Ust-Kubinsky District, Vologda Oblast, Russia. The population was 478 as of 2002. There are 14 streets.

== Geography ==
The distance to Ustye is 7 km. Kanskoye is the nearest rural locality.
