= Vysokaya, Kichmengsko-Gorodetsky District, Vologda Oblast =

Vysokaya Высокая
- Village
- Location within Vologda Oblast Location within Russia
- Coordinates: 59°48′N 45°27′E
- Country: Russia
- Region: Vologda Oblast
- District: Kichmengsko-Gorodetsky District
- Time zone: UTC+3:00

Vysokaya (Russian: Высокая) is a rural locality (a village) in Kichmengksoye Rural Settlement, Kichmengsko-Gorodetsky District, Vologda Oblast, Russia. The population was 2 as of 2002.

== Geography ==
Vysokaya is located 108 km southwest of Kichmengsky Gorodok (the district's administrative centre) by road. Kurilovo is the nearest rural locality.
