= Vysokoye, Romnensky District, Amur Oblast =

Vysokoye Высокое
- Selo
- Location within Amur Oblast Location within Russia
- Coordinates: 50°31′N 128°43′E
- Country: Russia
- Region: Amur Oblast
- District: Romnensky District
- Time zone: UTC+9:00

Vysokoye (Russian: Высокое) is a rural locality (a selo) in Rogozovsky Selsoviet of Romnensky District, Amur Oblast, Russia. The population was 16 as of 2018. There are 2 streets.

== Geography ==
Vysokoye is located on the left bank of the Amaranka River, 59 km southwest of Romny (the district's administrative centre) by road. Grigoryevka is the nearest rural locality.
