= Vysokaya, Sokolsky District, Vologda Oblast =

Vysokaya Высокая
- Village
- Location within Vologda Oblast Location within Russia
- Coordinates: 59°35′N 41°17′E
- Country: Russia
- Region: Vologda Oblast
- District: Sokolsky District
- Time zone: UTC+3:00

Vysokaya (Russian: Высокая) is a rural locality (a village) in Chuchkovskoye Rural Settlement, Sokolsky District, Vologda Oblast, Russia. The population was 7 as of 2002.

== Geography ==
The distance to Sokol is 86 km, to Chuchkovo is 3 km. Pustoshka is the nearest rural locality.
