= Vysokoye, Liskinsky District, Voronezh Oblast =

Vysokoye Высокое
- Selo
- Location within Voronezh Oblast Location within Russia
- Coordinates: 51°03′N 39°29′E
- Country: Russia
- Region: Voronezh Oblast
- District: Liskinsky District
- Time zone: UTC+3:00

Vysokoye (Russian: Высокое) is a rural locality (a selo) and the administrative center of Vysokinskoye Rural Settlement, Liskinsky District, Voronezh Oblast, Russia. The population was 2,294 as of 2010. There are 19 streets.

== Geography ==
Vysokoye is located 11 km north of Liski (the district's administrative centre) by road. Liski is the nearest rural locality.
