= Vysokoye, Verkhovazhsky District, Vologda Oblast =

Vysokoye Высокое
- Village
- Location within Vologda Oblast Location within Russia
- Coordinates: 60°45′N 42°02′E
- Country: Russia
- Region: Vologda Oblast
- District: Verkhovazhsky District
- Time zone: UTC+3:00

Vysokoye (Russian: Высокое) is a rural locality (a village) in Nizhne-Vazhskoye Rural Settlement, Verkhovazhsky District, Vologda Oblast, Russia. The population was 7 as of 2002.

== Geography ==
Vysokoye is located 3 km north of Verkhovazhye (the district's administrative centre) by road. Naumikha is the nearest rural locality.
