= Vysokaya, Velikoustyugsky District, Vologda Oblast =

Vysokaya Высокая
- Village
- Location within Vologda Oblast Location within Russia
- Coordinates: 60°39′N 46°48′E
- Country: Russia
- Region: Vologda Oblast
- District: Velikoustyugsky District
- Time zone: UTC+3:00

Vysokaya (Russian: Высокая) is a rural locality (a village) in Pokrovskoye Rural Settlement, Velikoustyugsky District, Vologda Oblast, Russia. The population was 2 as of 2002.

== Geography ==
Vysokaya is located 40 km southeast of Veliky Ustyug (the district's administrative centre) by road. Korolyovo is the nearest rural locality.
