= Vysokoye, Vorobyovsky District, Voronezh Oblast =

Vysokoye Высокое
- Settlement
- Location within Voronezh Oblast Location within Russia
- Coordinates: 50°47′N 41°09′E
- Country: Russia
- Region: Voronezh Oblast
- District: Vorobyovsky District
- Time zone: UTC+3:00

Vysokoye (Russian: Высокое) is a rural locality (a settlement) in Beryozovskoye Rural Settlement, Vorobyovsky District, Voronezh Oblast, Russia. The population was 56 as of 2010. There are 2 streets.

== Geography ==
Vysokoye is located 27 km northeast of Vorobyovka (the district's administrative centre) by road. Bannoye is the nearest rural locality.
