= Mount Vysokaya =

Mountain in Russia

Coordinates: 57°54′04″N 59°55′04″E

Vysokaya (Russian: Высокая) is a mountain in the eastern part of the Middle Urals in Sverdlovsk Oblast in Russia. The height of the mountain is 380 m. It is formed with porphyries and syenites. A large lodestone deposit is located on the mountain.
