= Esna Landscape Conservation Area =

Protected area in Estonia

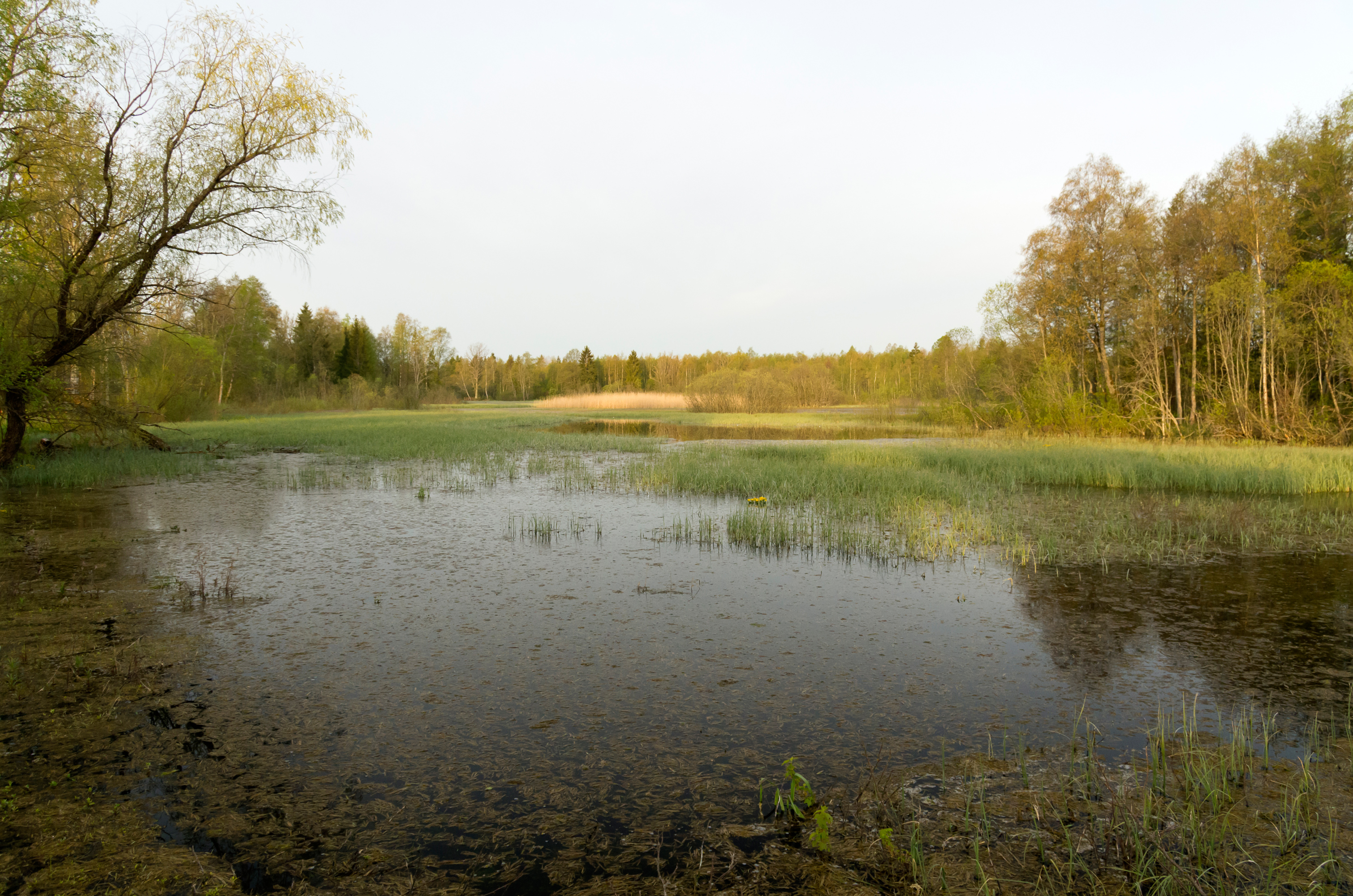

- Location within Estonia
- Location: Estonia
- Coordinates: 58°59′N 25°47′E
- Area: 226 ha (560 acres)
- Established: 1972 (2006)

Esna Landscape Conservation Area is a nature park situated in Järva County, Estonia.

Its area is 226 ha.

The protected area was designated in 1972 to protect Esna Park and Esna Springs and its surrounding areas. In 2006, the protected area was redesigned to the landscape conservation area.
