= Esna, Järva Parish =

Village in Estonia

Coordinates: 58°58′13″N 25°46′48″E

Esna
- Village
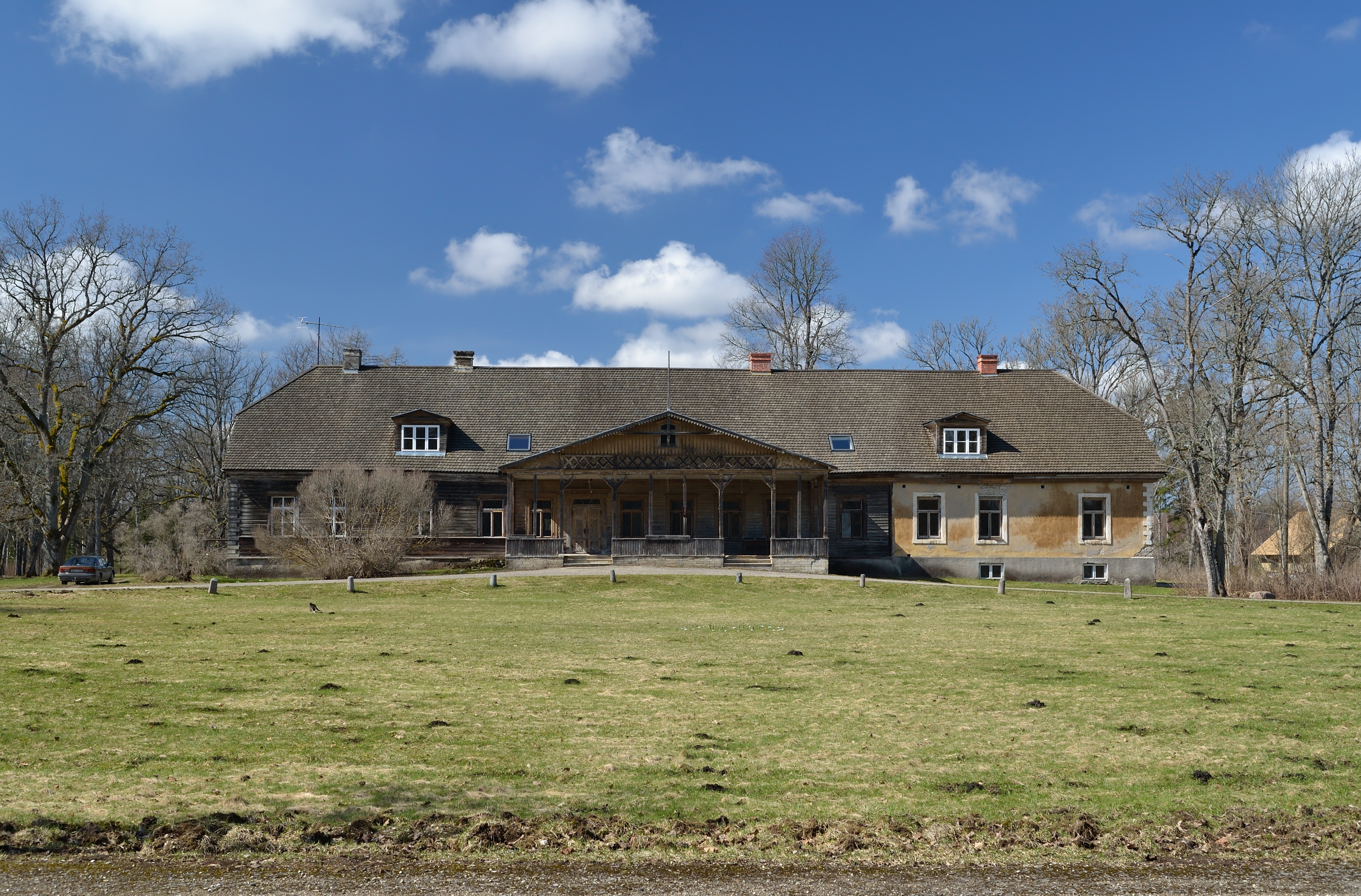
- Esna manor
- Interactive map of Esna
- Country: Estonia
- County: Järva County
- Parish: Järva Parish
- Time zone: UTC+2 (EET)
  - Summer (DST): UTC+3 (EEST)

Esna is a village in Järva Parish, Järva County in northern-central Estonia.

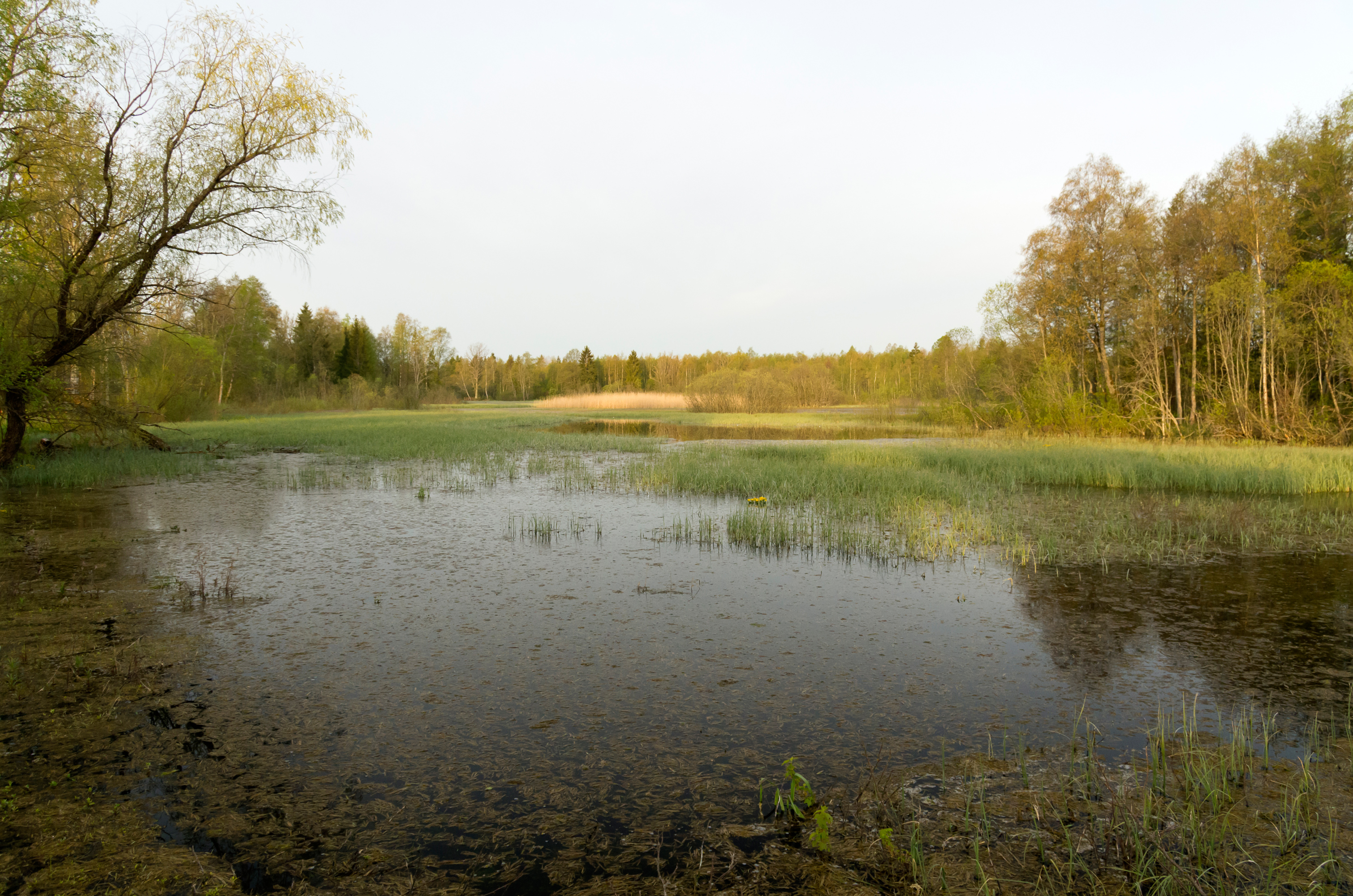
Esna spring lake
