= Meremäe Parish =

Former municipality of Estonia

Coordinates: 57°44′52″N 27°27′40″E

Meremäe Parish Meremäe vald
- Former municipality of Estonia
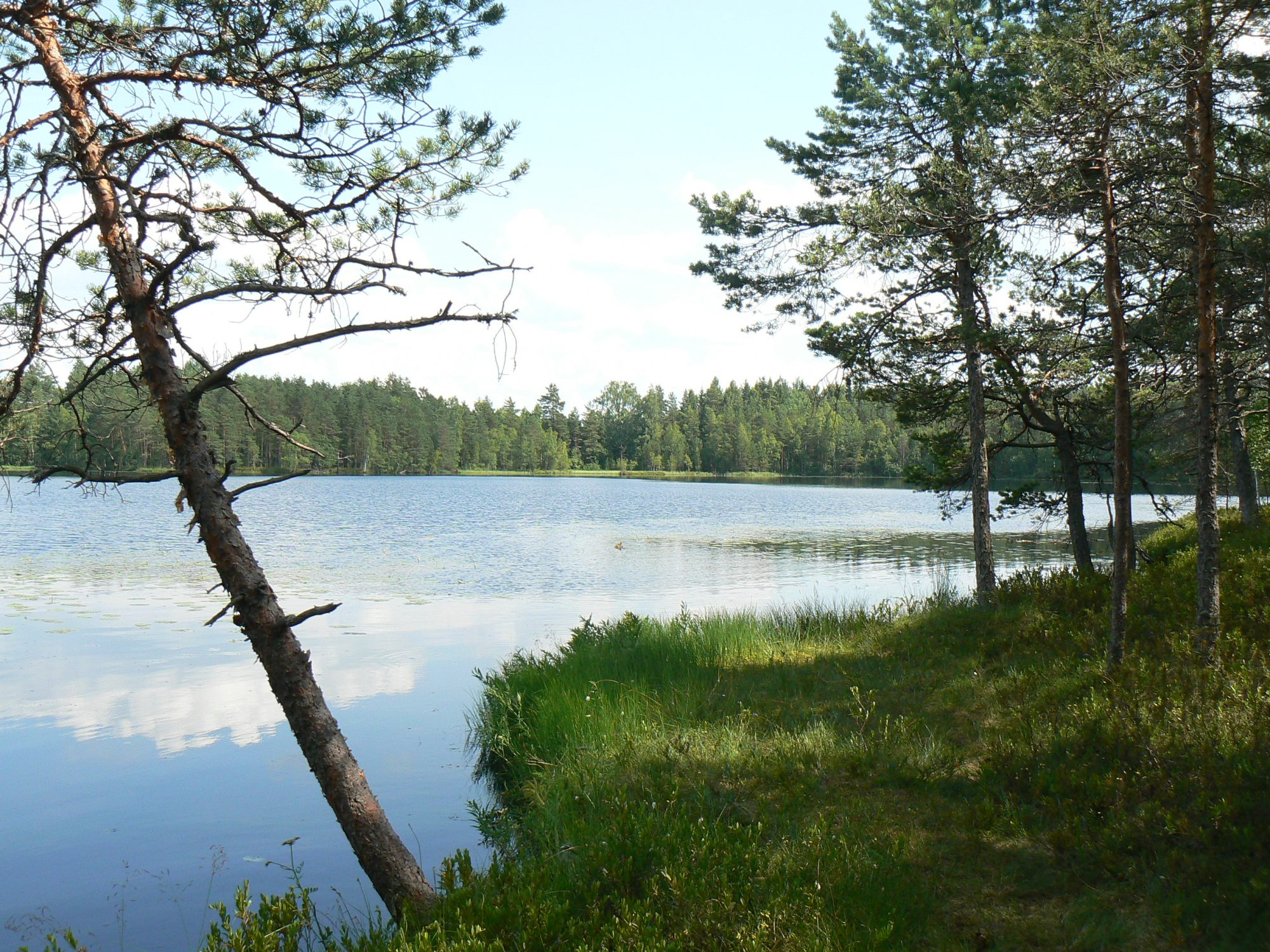
- Engli Lake

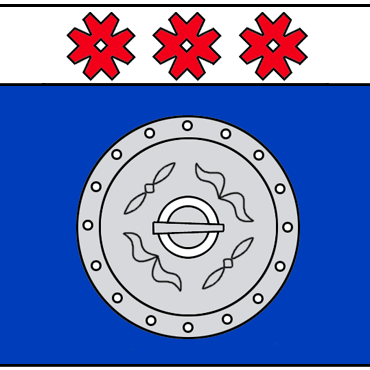
- Flag Coat of arms

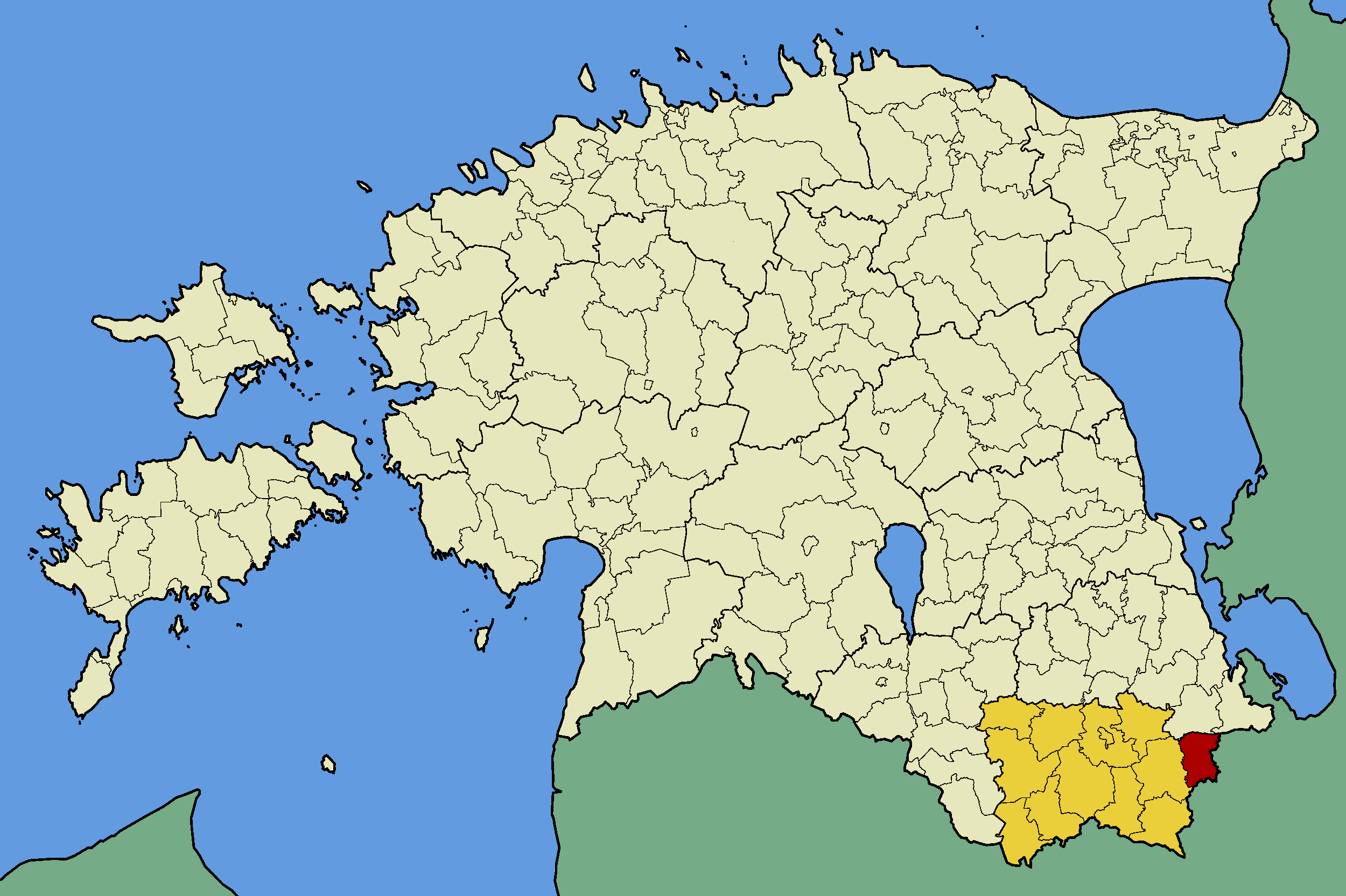
- Meremäe Parish within Võru County.
- Country: Estonia
- County: Võru County
- Administrative centre: Meremäe

Area
  - Total: 131.97 km^{2} (50.95 sq mi)

Population (01.01.2009)
  - Total: 1,140
  - Density: 8.64/km^{2} (22.4/sq mi)
- Website: www.meremae.ee

Meremäe Parish (Estonian: Meremäe vald) was a rural municipality of Estonia, in Võru County. It had a population of 1,140 (as of 1 January 2009) and an area of 131.97 km^{2}.

Meremäe is a part of the cultural region of Setomaa.

Since 2012 the municipality governor is Rein Järvelill.

== Settlements ==
The following is a list of all of the reported villages and other settlements in the Parish: Ala-Tsumba – Antkruva – Ermakova – Härmä – Helbi – Hilana – Hilläkeste – Holdi – Ignasõ – Jaanimäe – Jõksi – Juusa – Kalatsova – Kangavitsa – Karamsina – Kasakova – Kastamara – Keerba – Kiiova – Kiislova – Kiksova – Kitsõ – Klistina – Kõõru – Korski – Kuigõ – Kuksina – Küllätüvä – Kusnetsova – Lepä – Lindsi – Lutja – Maaslova – Marinova – Martsina – Masluva – Melso – Merekülä – Meremäe – Miikse – Miku – Navikõ – Obinitsa – Olehkova – Ostrova – Paklova – Palandõ – Palo – Paloveere – Pelsi – Pliia – Poksa – Polovina – Puista – Raotu – Rokina – Ruutsi – Seretsüvä – Serga – Sirgova – Sulbi – Tääglova – Talka – Tedre – Tepia – Tessova – Teterüvä – Tiirhanna – Tiklasõ – Tobrova – Treiali – Triginä – Tsergondõ – Tsirgu – Tsumba – Tuplova – Tuulova – Ulaskova – Uusvada – Vaaksaarõ – Väiko-Härmä – Väiko-Serga – Vaarkali — Vasla – Veretinä – Vinski – Viro – Võmmorski.

The larger villages were Meremäe (146 residents) and Obinitsa (135 residents). None of the other villages were reported to have more than 34 people living there in 2011.

== Education ==
Obinitsa Kindergarten and Meremäe School which operate as a kindergarten/basic school are situated in the Meremäe municipality.

== History ==
=== Independent Estonia ===
The Meremäe rural municipality was established on 23 May 1922. It belonged under Petseri County (Estonian: Petserimaa). Meremäe rural municipality was formed as a result of the administrative-territorial reform, in the course of which the four large municipalities of Petseri County were divided into 11 smaller ones. Meremäe rural municipality was initially called Obinitsa.

In 1922, on the 13th and 14 August the first elections of the rural municipality council took place. Nikolai Rammula was elected as the mayor of the rural municipality; Johan Tamm became the rural municipality secretary. The Rural Municipality Office was situated in the household of a family named Kärner in Põrste village. A new rural municipality building – Meremäe Town Hall, was built quite near to the geographical centre of the municipality, at the intersection of the historic Võru-Petseri and Pankjavitsa-Kiirova-Orava-Räpina roads. Today this building is used as Meremäe Youth Centre.

On 16 May 1923, Obinitsa rural municipality was renamed Meremäe rural municipality. New elections took place the same year, where the runners for the rural municipality council were districts by the names of "Krundimehed", "Mihailova District", "Mihailova and Vasilde Districts United" and "Obinitsa District" A total of 75 candidates were listed. Nikolai Rammula was re-elected for rural municipality mayor and Johan Tamm for secretary.

=== Soviet ===
During Soviet times, a system of different village councils existed on the rural municipality territory. Kalatsova, Obinitsa and Veretion each had a separate village council, and at first these were subordinates to the Meremäe Rural Municipality Executive Committee who, in turn, were subordinated to Võru County and later to the executive committee of the Vastseliina District. The executive committee of the rural municipality was later dissolved. Kalatsova Village Council was renamed to Meremäe Village Council, whilst Veretino Village Council was merged with Obinitsa and Meremäe. Only five days after the restoration of the Soviet occupation in Petseri Country, Moscow decided to nullify the Estonian gains of Tartu Treaty (1920) and surrender three quarters of Petseri County to Pskov County of Russian SFSR on August 15, 1944. Estonian SSR liquidate the rump of Petseri County and transferred remaining municipalities to Võru County. A significant part of that was from Meremäe rural municipality territory, including villages around Krantsova, Kiirova and Vasilde, were surrendered to Russian SFSR.

=== Reindependent Estonia ===
After the dissolution of Vastseliina District in 1959, they became part of the Võru District. On 3 September 1960, Meremäe Village Council was merged with what was then known as Illi Village Council (the villages from the Kapera, Möldre and Vana-Vastseliina area). The self-governing status of Meremäe rural municipality was reinstated on 5 March 1992. On 1 January 1998, control of the villages in Vastseliina parish was returned to Vastseliina rural municipality and the Meremäe rural municipality of today covers a region of 132 square kilometres, and has 87 smaller and larger villages of the historic Setomaa region. Meremäe rural municipality building has moved a number of times. Originally, the rural municipality office was situated in the household of the Kärner family in Põrste village. Later, the building for the rural municipality was built in Meremäe, however that building became Meremäe youth centre when the present rural municipality building was built in 1932.

== Notable landmarks ==
=== Religious landmarks ===
Churches:

- The Obinitsa Church of Transfiguration of Our Lord, belonging to the Estonian Apostolic Orthodox Church
- The Meeksi Estonian Apostolic Orthodox Church of St. John the Baptist
- Obinitsa School-Church (closed).

Typical small Seto chapels (Estonian: tsässon):

- Küllätüvä Chapel
- Meldova Chapel
- Serga Chapel
- Tobrova Chapel
- Uusvada Chapel
- Ulaskova Chapel
- Pelsi Chapel
- Rokina Chapel
- Obinitsa Chapel
- Härmä Chapel
- Kuigõ Chapel

Almost all the chapels in the villages of Miikse and Viro have perished. The Viro stone cross is situated at the location of Viro Chapel.

Burial grounds:

- Obinitsa graveyard
- Sakalovapalo burial mounds
- Miikse graveyard.

Other sacred places:

- Uusvada ludimägi
- Jaanikivi (John's stone, traditionally used for sacrifices)

=== Landforms ===
Hills:

- Kuksina Hill
- Meremäe Hill – the hill is also a home to a viewing tower and a song stage

Rivers and lakes:

- Piusa River
- Pelska River
- Obinitsa Stream
- Obinitsa Lake
- Hilläkeste Lake

Caves and sandstone outcrops:

- Make wall
- Härma Alumine wall
- Härma Mäemine wall
- Obinitsa Juudatare cave (known locally as Satan's cave)

Springs:

- Tepia sacrificial spring
- Ojaotsa Springs (known as Tuhkvitsa Springs)
- Kõõru sacrificial spring (known as Müräläte)

=== Other landmarks ===
Monuments and sculptures:

The monument to the Singing Mother of the Seto People stands on the high bank of Obinitsa artificial lake, modelled by sculptor E. Rebane, E. Taniloo in 1986. Memorial stones to other famous local singers of the area stand around the monument.

Parks:

- Meremäe Park of Mourning
- Meremäe birch grove

Hiking trails:

- Piusa River Hiking Trail

Museums and culture centres:

- Obinitsa museum
- Luikjärve farm
- Hal`as Kunn Art Gallery
- Obinitsa Village Centre
- Obinitsa Community Centre.

== Indigenous Species ==
The region has two indigenous species of pine, the Meremäe pines and the Tsirgu pine.

== Entrepreneurship ==
The more important businesses in Meremäe rural municipality are operating in the fields of agriculture, tourism, creative industry and mining industry. Piusa Ancient Valley Holiday Complex and Setomaa Tourist Farm are the most notable tourism businesses. Marinova dolostone quarry is located within the rural municipality.
