= Meremäe Hill =

Hill in Estonia

- Meremäe mägi
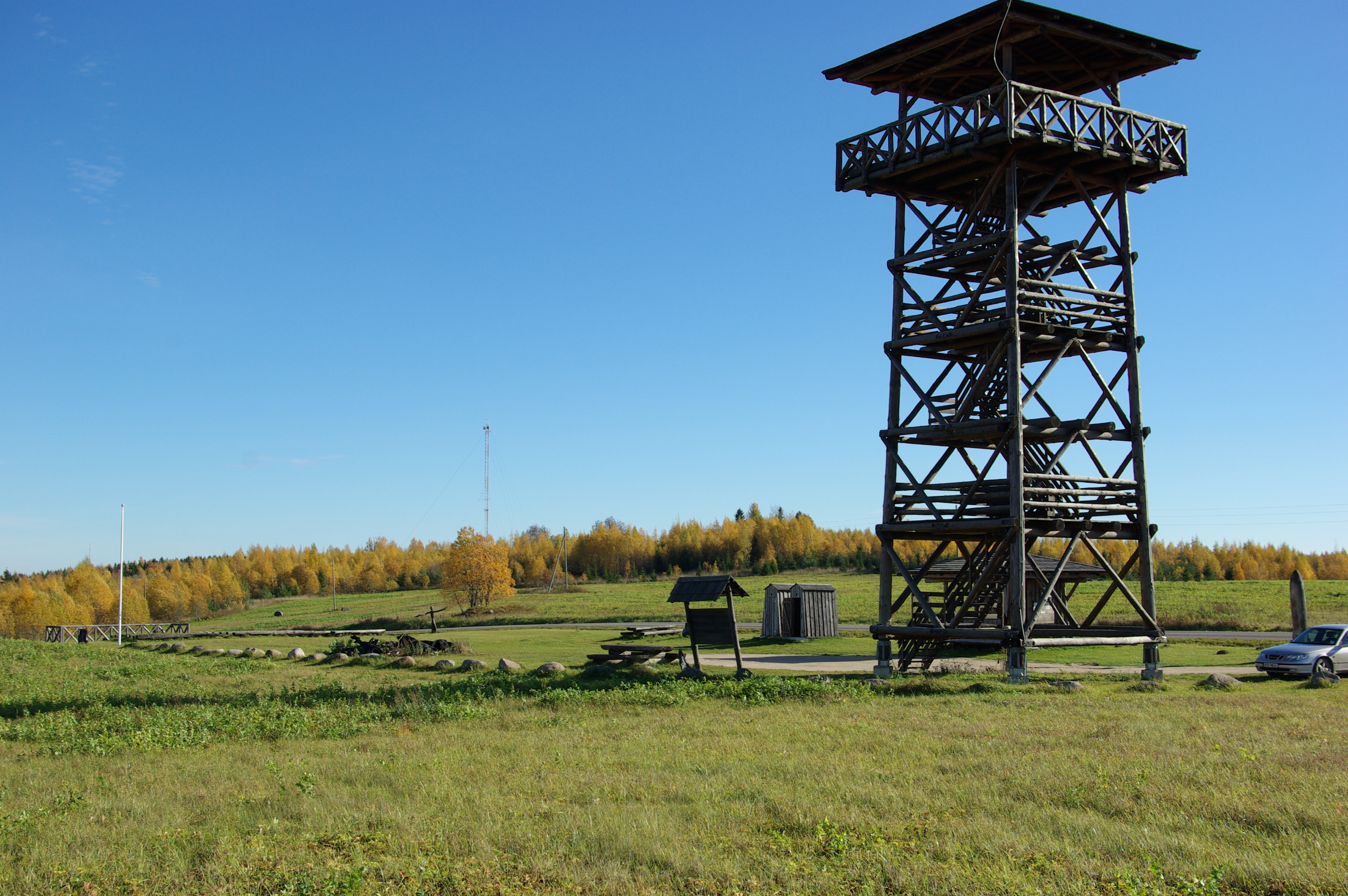
- Meremäe Hill

Highest point
- Elevation: 204 m (669 ft)
- Coordinates: 57°44′07.45″N 27°25′40.08″E

Geography
- Location: Setomaa Parish, Võru County, Estonia

Meremäe Hill (Estonian: Meremäe mägi) is a hillock in southeastern Estonia. Located on Vaaksaare upland, that belongs to the eastern part of Haanja Upland. Height from sea-level is 204 m.

Vaaksaare uplands is a moraine hillock, where agricultural patches alternate with forests and meadows. Meremäe Hill is situated on the border of Kalatsova and Mereküla village. A large part of Setomaa can be seen from the Hill in clear weather, as well as Vastseliina church and Pachory Monastery church domes. Reflection of water from Lake Pskov can also be seen in clear weather, which is probably how the area got its name - by assuming that the reflection was sea (Meremäe – Sea Hill). In 2008, Meremäe rural municipality government built a viewing tower on the Hill and a song stage. Meremäe viewing tower was built in 2008 and is an 18-metre high wooden tower with a shingle roof. The song stage and grounds at the foot of the tower have St. John's day and other events held there every year.
