= Jaanimäe =

Jaanimäe may refer to:

- Jaanimäe, Rõuge Parish, Estonia
- Jaanimäe, Setomaa Parish, Estonia
