= Viro stone cross =

Stone cross in Estonia

Coordinates: 57°45′21″N 27°27′6″E

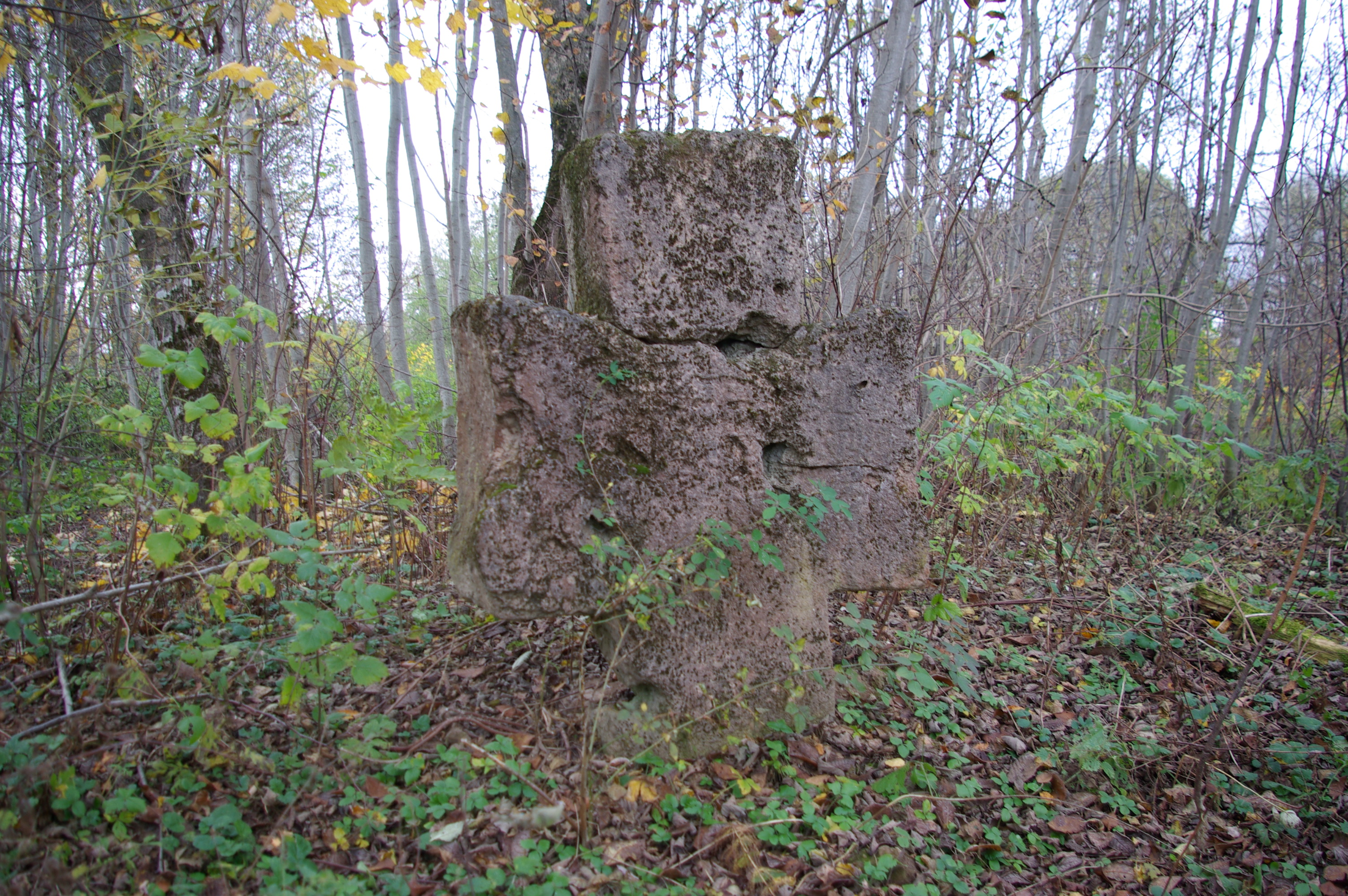
Viro stone cross

Viro stone cross marks the location of Viro Chapel (Estonian: tsässon) in the village of Viro in Estonia. It is located 1 kilometre from the village of Meremäe toward Obinitsa. This limestone cross from the 15th century is the only one remaining in the Meremäe rural municipality. Viro Chapel was a Passover Day chapel.

== History ==
The chapel that once stood at this location was dedicated to the Transfiguration of our Lord, a holiday celebrated on August 6 in the villages of Hilläkeste, Palandõ, and Viro. In 1994, the walls of the building were still standing, but the roof had already fallen in. In spring of 2000, Priit Laanoja cleared the place from decayed logs and only a stone cross that was in the chapel was left on the premises.

== The Chapel ==
According to the data from the dispatch office of Friedrich R. Kreutzwald's Memorial Museum, Viro Chapel was a building of horizontal beams with quadrangular layout. The beams were manually hacked by an axe and the floor was made from beams hacked in half. The roof was made from shingles and had a cross on it. By 1974, all that was left was the icon room, the entrance-room had been torn down earlier. The dimensions of the chapel: length 3.6 metres, width 3.4 metres and height 2.85 metres. V. Talumees believed that the stone cross that was in the chapel dates back to the founding of Petseri monastery (15th-16th centuries). The cross has letters written on it that are unreadable.

== The Cross ==
The dimensions of the cross are: height 1.3 metres, width 0.92 metres and thickness 0.3 metres.
