= Vaarkali =

Vaarkali or Varkali may refer to several places in Estonia:

- Vaarkali, Rõuge Parish, village in Võru County, Rõuge Parish, Estonia
- Vaarkali, Võru Parish, village in Võru County, Võru Parish, Estonia
