= Viro =

Viro may refer to:

== People ==
- Viro Small, an African American wrestler
- Oleg Viro, a Russian mathematician
- Viro, the Catholicos of the Caucasian Albanian Church in the early 7th century

== Places ==
- Viro, the Finnish-language name for Estonia
- Porto Viro, a municipality in Veneto, Italy
- Viro, a village in Setomaa Parish, Võru County, Estonia

== Other uses ==
- Viro, a Croatian sugar company
- Viro, a fictional character in the manga series Elemental Gelade
