= Tepia sacrificial spring =

Spring in Estonia

Coordinates: 57°45′29″N 27°28′38″E

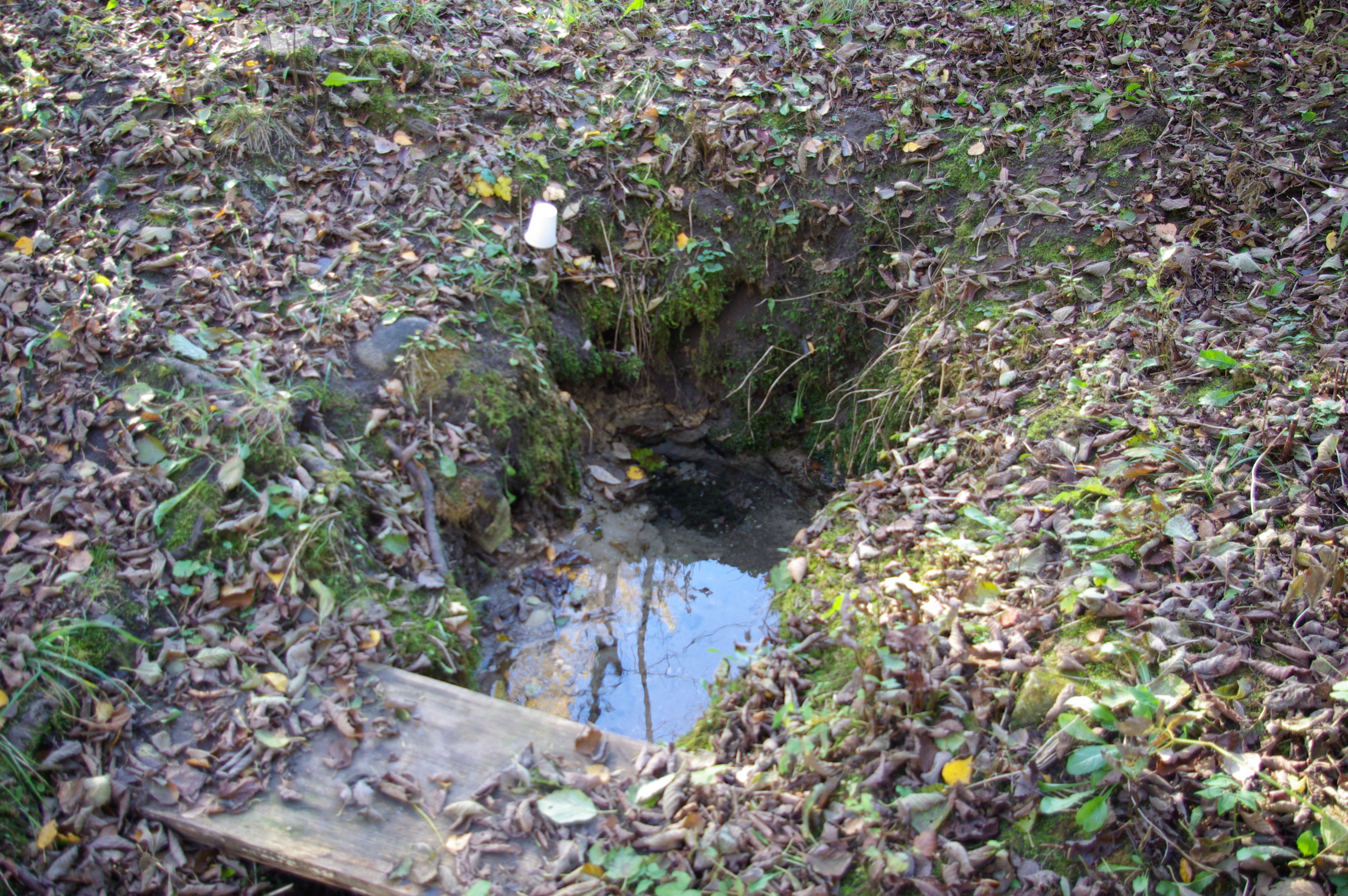
Tepia sacrificial spring

Tepia sacrificial spring, also known as Tepia silmaallikas or Tepia silmaläte (spring for eyes) is a spring in Võru County, Meremäe rural municipality, in Tepia village by Tuhkvitsa stream in Estonia. The spring is situated in a forest beside Lätteperve farm field, about 330 metres north-east of Lätteperve farm buildings. The spring is under protection as a cultural monument. The spring was believed to have healing properties. People were hoping to get healed by the spring and used to make donations by throwing coins or flowers in it. One could not take the coins thrown in the spring home, as it was believed that this would bring sickness in.
