= Sakalovapalo burial mounds =

Ancient burial grounds in Estonia

Coordinates: 57°48′59″N 27°26′39″E

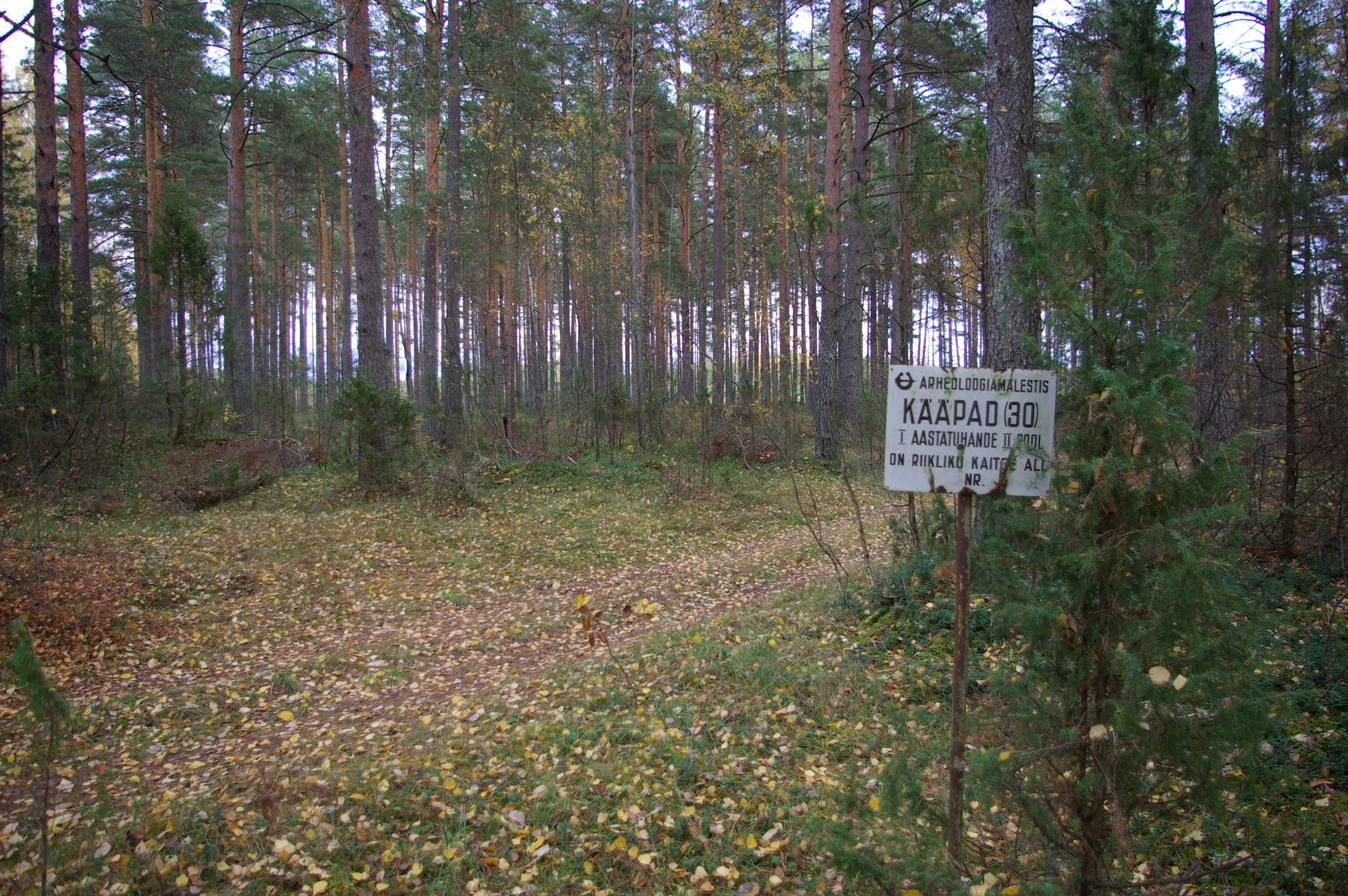
Sakalovapalo burial mounds

Sakalovapalo burial mounds is an ancient burial ground, a cemetery in Obinitsa village, Setomaa Parish, Võru County in southeastern Estonia. A stone cross used to be located near the burial mounds and the place was important and well known for the people in the region. The stone cross was destroyed during Soviet rule; many other burial mounds were also destroyed during the same period, as the sand from the mound was used on the roads nearby for antiskid treatment. The cross was a donation place, where passersby brought money, buttons, strings of yarn and other things. Red and white ribbons were tied to the bushes near the cross. People in the former times thought that the mounds date back to the Great Northern War or Swedish Rule and told stories of great battles in connection with the mounds. The mounds have been examined in different times by different archaeologists. In 1913, the excavations were done by Russian geologist V. Kreiton. K. Mark, E. Astel, E. Richter, J. Linnus and many others have also done excavations in the mounds. The cemetery might have initially had up to 50 sand mounds. 36 of them have been preserved, 8 of which are extended mounds and 28 are round mounds. The mounds are so far the oldest archaeological relics in Obinitsa area.

== Legends ==
According to one legend, it is a Swedish cemetery, dating back to the Great Northern War (1700–1721). Round mounds are said to be the burial places for horses and the oval ones for people. To commemorate the dead, a large stone cross was placed there. At one point, the cross was taken to Taelova, but on the way, horses began to bolt and pull back, so the cross was taken back to its place. Another story is that gold has been buried near Sakalovapalo mounds and it is supposed to be in the place where one can see Saalesa or Saatse church domes. Battles of the Great Northern War were said to have lasted long in Obinitsa region, where Russian general Sokolovski (Sakalov in Seto language) is said to have fallen. His grave is said to have been in the area of the mounds and a large stone cross was put on the grave and attached to a growing pine by a chain. In addition, the people in the former times told about an essütaja (a magical spirit, who leads people astray in the forests) who lived in the Sakalova heathy pine forest.
