= Meremäe Park of Mourning =

Memorial in Estonia

Coordinates: 57°44′51″N 27°27′28″E

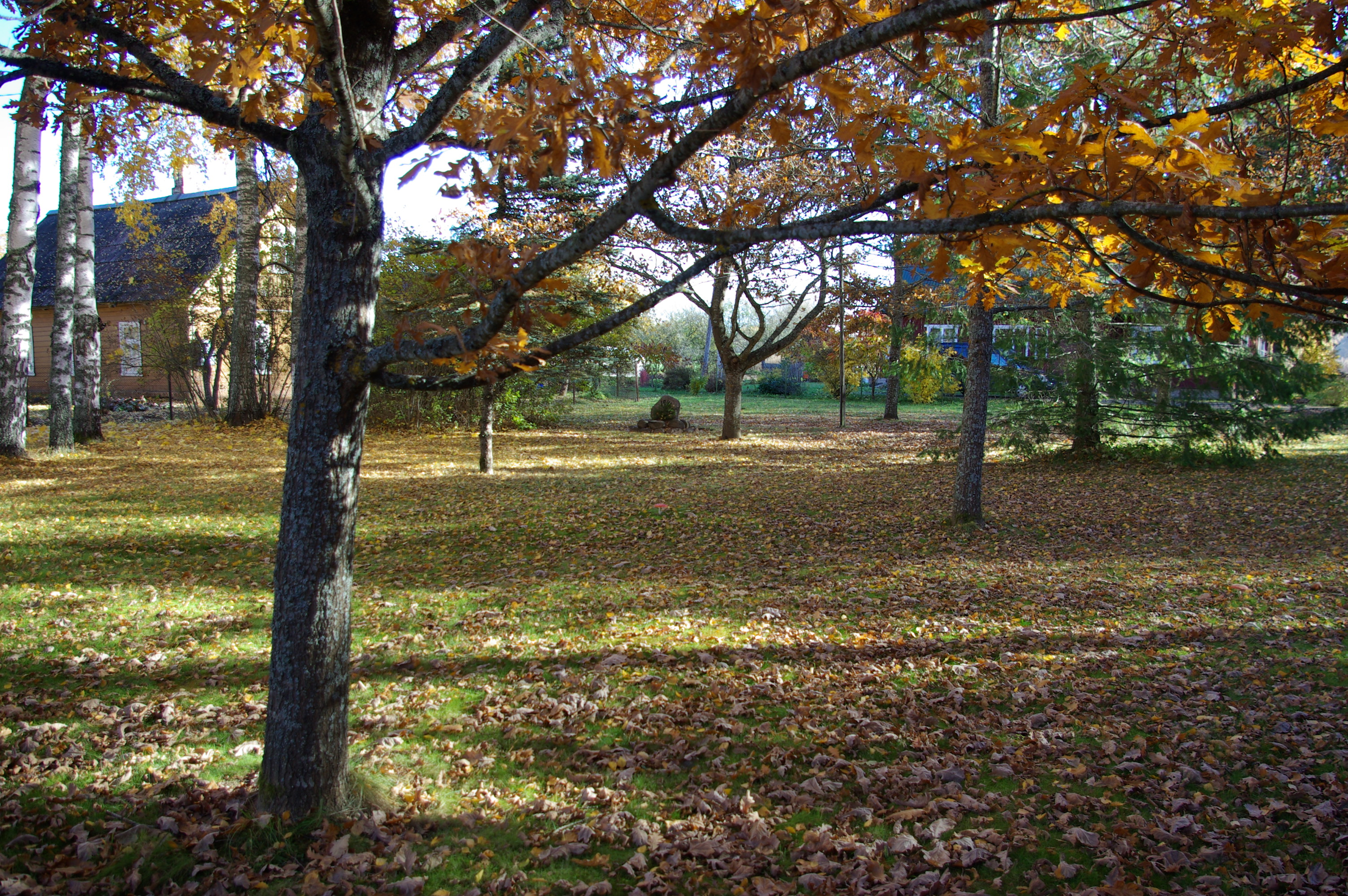
Meremäe Park of Mourning

Meremäe Park of Mourning is a park in Meremäe rural municipality in Estonia to the honour of the deported people. The park has a modest and simple memorial stone for the deported. The park and memorial stone are dedicated to the victims of repression of Soviet rule, foremost, to the victims of the three deportations taking place around the area. The park and the memorial were established by Voldemar Rannaste on his estate, who was deported to Siberia as a 16-year-old boy with his parents during the 1941 June deportation. The park has a small burial cairn and eight oaks planted in memoriam of the deported. Each tree represents a family deported from Meremäe in 1941. The park of mourning was solemnised on 14 June 1991, on the 50th anniversary of June deportation. The ceremony was carried out by an orthodox priest Father Yevgeni. It is a holy place for the rural municipality, where people bring flowers and burn candles and memorial events are being held.
