= Miku, Estonia =

Village in Estonia

Miku
- Village
- Location in Estonia
- Coordinates: 57°49′27″N 27°24′38″E
- Country: Estonia
- County: Võru County
- Municipality: Setomaa Parish

Miku is a village in Setomaa Parish, Võru County, southeastern Estonia. In the local dialect also Mikukülä or Mikumäë. Historically it belongs to the Nulku Mokornulk. It was first mentioned in 1585.

Before the Administrative reform in Estonia, it was part of the Meremäe Parish (abolished).

Until 1585, the village of Miku belonged to the Pskov thousander Fyodor Solovtsov, and later to the Pskov-Pechersky Monastery. In the 18th century, the village belonged to the Taylovsky parish (Estonian: Taeluva kihelkond), and in the 19th century, it was part of the Obinitsa community.
