= Meremäe birch grove =

Protected birch forest in Estonia

Coordinates: 57°44′59″N 27°27′48″E

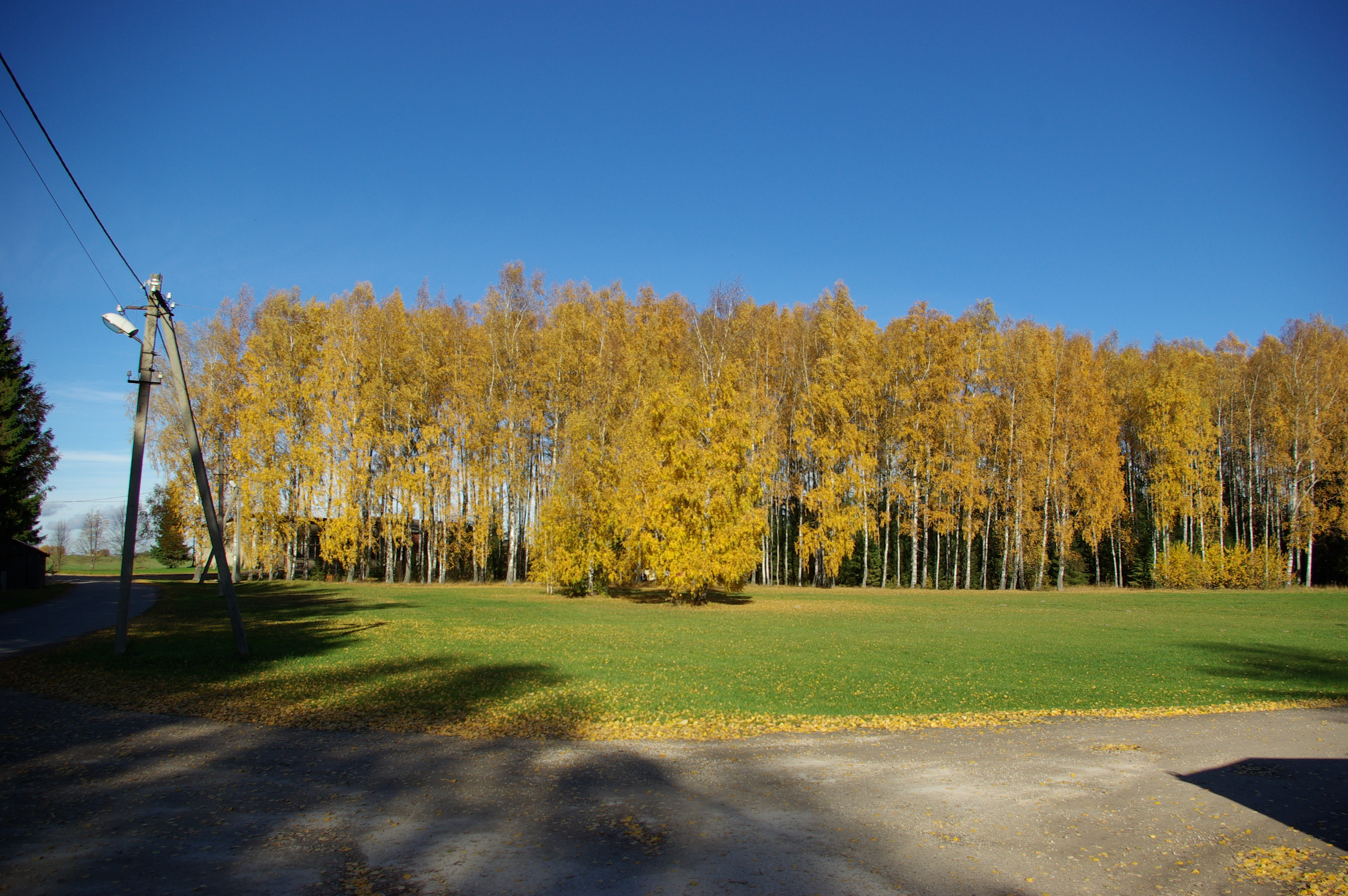
Meremäe birch grove

Meremäe birch grove, also known as Kärner birch grove, is a forest stand under protection in Meremäe rural municipality, in Meremäe village in Estonia. The surface area of the grove is 2.0 hectares (4.9 acres) and it is under state protection. The grove was taken under protection for the first time by decision no 33 of the executive committee of the Council of People's Deputies on 30 March 1962 “Arranging of Preservation of Nature and the Protection of Cultural Monuments in Võru District”. The birch grove has also been called Kärner's grove, because the forest stand was situated on the land of the former Kärner farm. People of Meremäe consider the birch grove as their recreation area and a delightful sight, as well as a symbol of the region. It is mostly a grove consisting of birches, with spruce being the dominant tree in the undergrowth.
