= Obinitsa museum =

Museum in Estonia

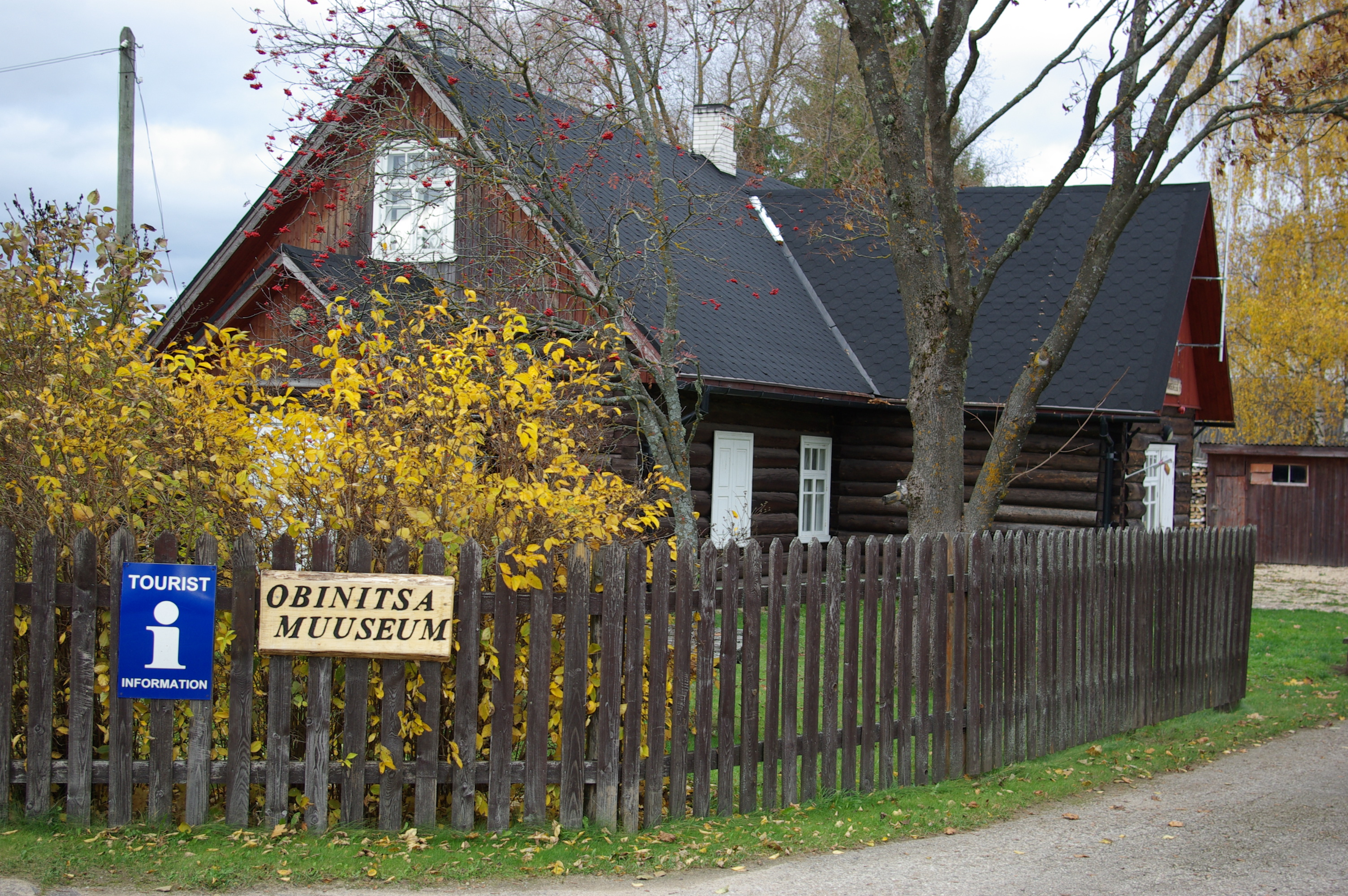
- Established: 1995; 31 years ago
- Location: Obinitsa, Meremäe Parish, Estonia
- Coordinates: 57°48′35.28″N 27°26′34″E
- Visitors: 2500/year
- Director: Eve Ellermäe
- Website: www.obinitsamuuseum.ee

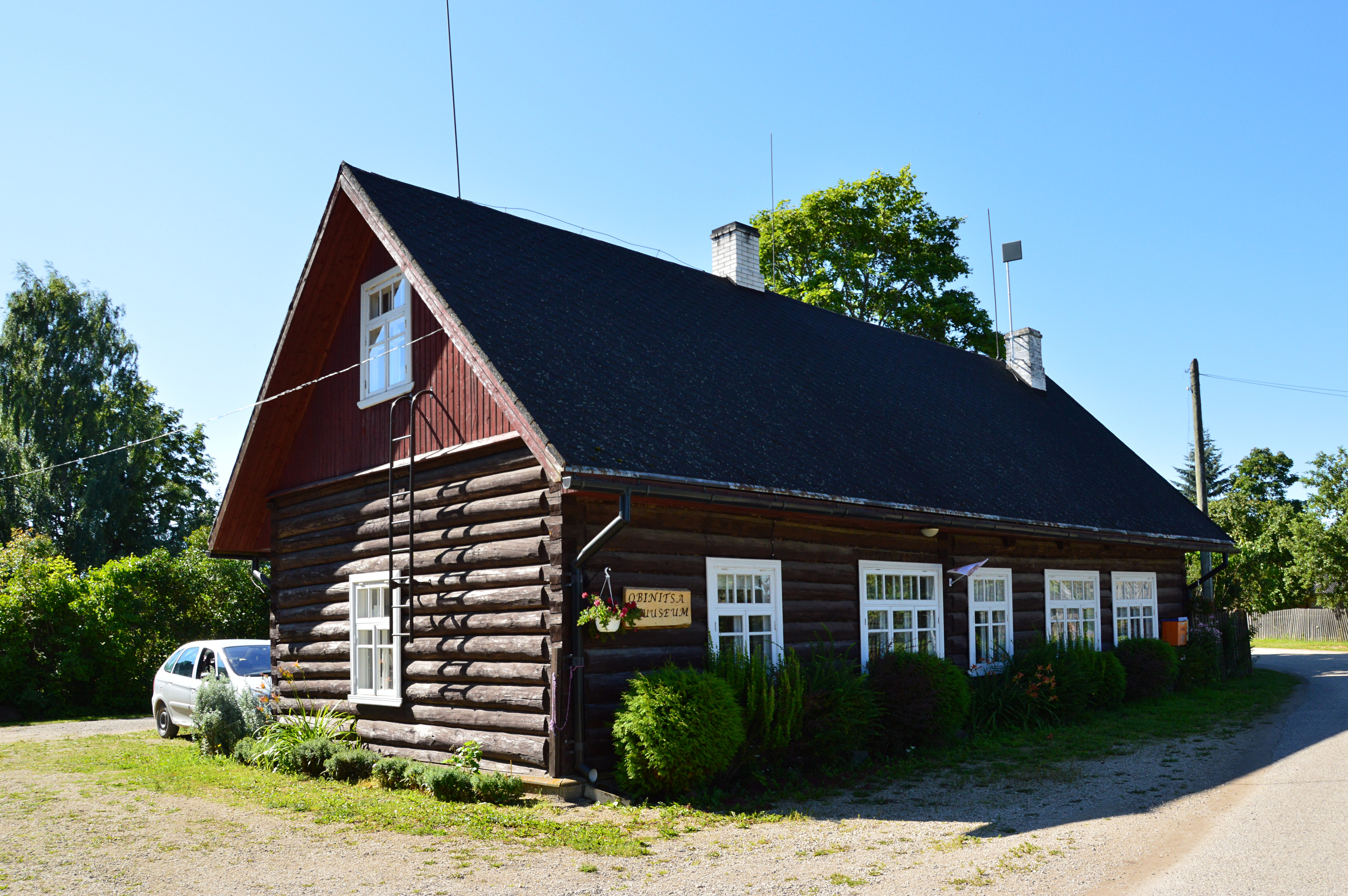
Obinitsa Museum in 2015

Obinitsa museum is a local museum, opened in 1995 in Obinitsa in Estonia.

The museum has two units: Obinitsa Seto Muuseumitarõ (located in the village of Obinitsa) and Seto fortress-farm or Luikjärve farm (situated 4 km from Obinitsa).

The museum hosts displays about Setumaa history and culture. Among them for example handicraft of Seto women, archaeological exhibition, and a chapel. The purpose of the museum is to collect and preserve the history, objects and cultural heritage of the villages in, foremost, Meremäe rural municipality area. A large portion of the museum objects date back to 1910-1940. As of 2012, there are around 2000 exhibits in the museum collection. Among others the following farmhouse objects are represented: Bedding, towels, holy icon scarves, floor rugs, table cloths, dishes, wooden tools, and furniture. The collection of Seto folk clothes: chemises, over-garments, overcoats, sashes, ribbons, linen pants, headdresses, aprons, stockings, jackets, moccasins, boots, etc.

Before 1994, the building of the museum had the Obinitsa library in it, managed by Liidia Sillaots. In April 1994, the library moved into the building of the newly built Obinitsa kindergarten. At the same year, in August, there was an exhibition of holy icon scarves in the empty library building together with the I Seto Kingdom Day and so it seemed that the building would be suitable for organising exhibitions. This ignited the wish of Liidia Sillaots to create a small local lore museum in Obinitsa. The year 1995 became the year of the creation of the museum and on 3 June 1995, Obinitsa Muuseumitarõ was inaugurated. It was the same day that large granite stones were brought to the statue of Singing Mother of the Seto People, to place memorial stones to local great leelo singers: To Hemmo Mast, Nasta Lust, Okse Luik and Tepa Vahvik. Obinitsa Artificial Lake in the valley under the Muuseumitarõ was inaugurated by Rafael Hindrikus, priest of Obinitsa congregation.
