= Hal'as Kunn Art Gallery =

Art gallery in Estonia

Hal`as Kunn Art Gallery
- Galerii Hal`as Kunn
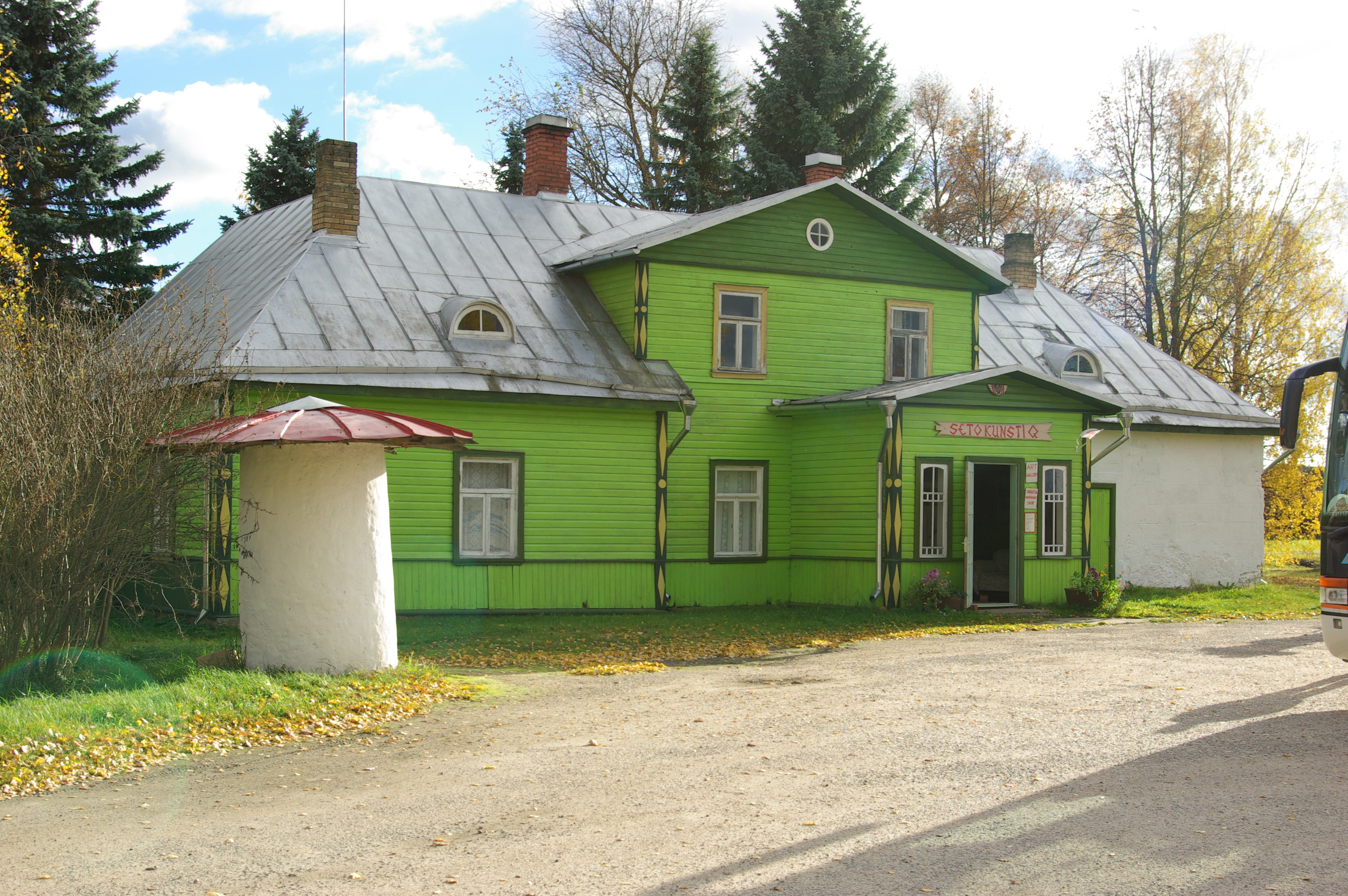
- Hal`as Kunn Art Gallery
- Interactive map of the Hal`as Kunn Art Gallery area

General information
- Type: Gallery
- Location: Obinitsa, Estonia
- Coordinates: 57°48′35″N 27°26′22″E

Hal`as Kunn Art Gallery, also known as Kalju maja, is an art gallery in Obinitsa village, Setomaa Parish, Võru County in southeastern Estonia.

The art gallery displays modern Seto art, but also other indigenous people's seasonal exhibitions. The following people are represented in the gallery: Ivanov Aleksandr (mari artist), Dõrin Juri (erza artist), Mikushev Pasha (komi), Rjabov Pjotr (erza), Mark Kostabi, Lauritsa Piitre, Toom Malev, Kalve Toomas, Margna Epp, Kiisson Lembit, Kuusing Mati ja Toomas, Riitsaar Evar, Riitsaar Raili, Gulk Albert, Navitrolla, Jürise Erki, Kalde Ove and Kalde Kalli, Puhvel Tuuli, Ijavoinen Eero, Kahusk Salme, Kahusk Päivi, Kahusk Maali, Kauksi Ülle.

== History ==
Originally, the building belonged to Ivan Kalju. The family of Ivan Kalju consisted of his wife Kati and their six children Anna, Maria, Alli, Sonja, Olli and Alli’s son Mihkel. In 1933, second floor was built on the house. Ivan set up a shop in the house. They sold household goods, mostly hardware. In 1940, the shop was nationalised, the family was announced Kulaks, Mihkel, the son was killed and part of the family was deported in 1949. In 1945, the Obinitsa Village Council was set up in the building. After that, the building has also hosted a dairy, post office, medical aid station, library and a community centre. Obinitsa sovkhoz office was located in the building during 1960-1995 Evar Riitsaar set up a gallery called Hal’as kunn in the building in 2004.
