= Meremäe Youth Centre =

Building in Võru County, Estonia

- Meremäe noortekeskus
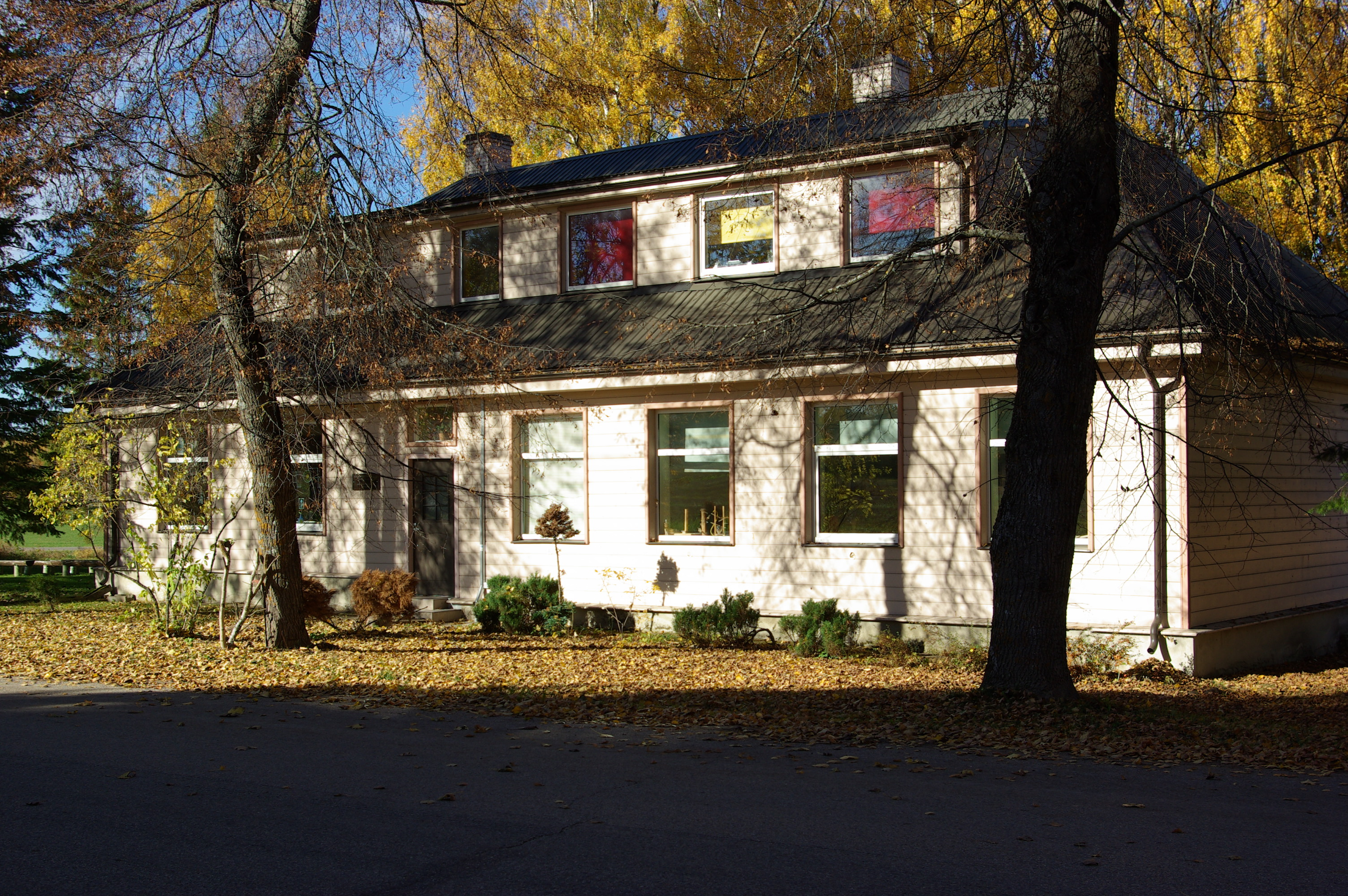
- Meremäe Youth Centre
- Interactive map of the Meremäe Youth Centre area

General information
- Location: Meremäe, Estonia
- Coordinates: 57°44′53″N 27°27′21″E

Meremäe Youth Centre is a youth centre in Meremäe rural municipality in Meremäe village in Estonia.

The Meremäe Municipality office used to be situated in the household of a family named Kärner in Põrste village. As a result of the arguments about the location of the centre of the rural municipality and its name, it was decided that it was to be built in the geographical centre of the municipality, to Mihailova puustus (wasteland), the intersection of the historic Võru-Petseri and Pankjavitsa-Kiirova-Orava-Räpina roads. The building for Meremäe Youth Centre was the first building built specifically as Meremäe rural municipality building. Since the mid-1920s a serious problem with the rooms of Serga Elementary School emerged, as keeping the school in several farm houses in Serga as well as Keerba and Vaarkal villages became more and more difficult. It was decided that Serga School is to be brought over to the rural municipality building and in around 1926–1927, the rural municipality council and government took on the building of a new and bigger rural municipality building i.e. office building. An important milestone for building the new rural municipality building was 31 January 1929, in which the owner of Unkipa farm and a citizen of Meremäe rural municipality Sement Prokofi p. Põhja and Efim Liivik, the deputy for Meremäe rural municipality community signed a contract of gift in Petseri with the public notary, Johan Piip, according to which Semen Põhja grants Meremäe rural municipality community a vacant plot on the size of 0.575 hectares under the name “Meremäe rural municipality building”. In 1932, forms from 1-4 of Serga Elementary School began their studies in the rural municipality building. For the 5th and 6th form, the rooms had to be rented in the household of Valter Seim for the time being. That was until the extension was finished in 1936. After that the school was renamed Meremäe. Later, the building hosted a dormitory of the school. Nowadays, Meremäe Youth Centre, technology class of Meremäe School and rooms for handicraft are operating in it.
