= Meremäe Town Hall =

Building in Võru County, Estonia

- Meremäe vallamaja
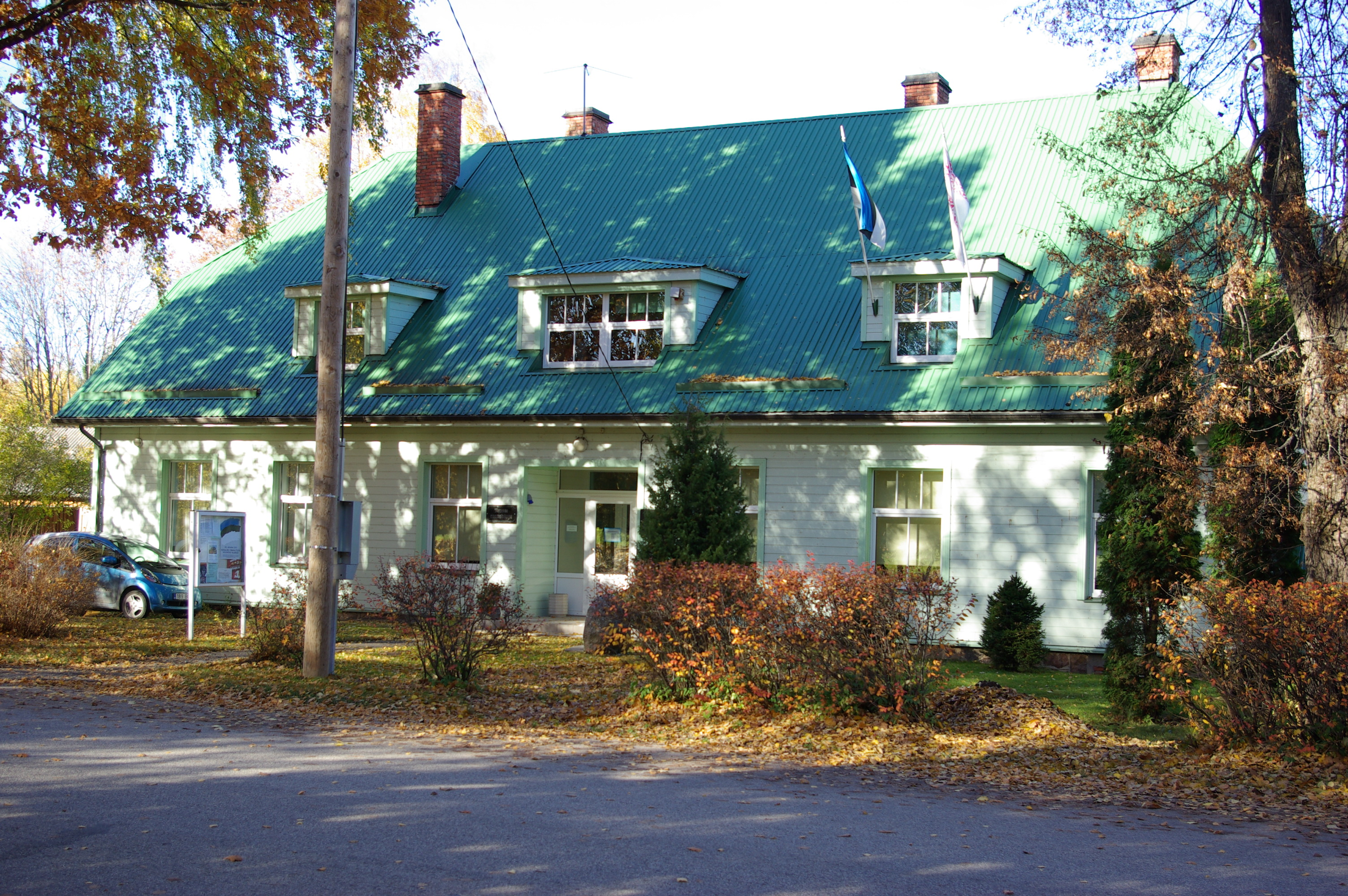
- Meremäe Town Hall
- Interactive map of the Meremäe Town Hall area

General information
- Type: Town hall
- Location: Meremäe, Estonia
- Coordinates: 57°44′52.73″N 27°27′23.4″E
- Completed: 1932

Meremäe Town Hall (Estonian: Meremäe vallamaja) is a building in Estonia, the site of the office of the Meremäe rural municipality.

== History ==
In the beginning, the municipality office was situated in the household of Kärner family in Põrste village. Arguments about the location of the centre and name of the rural municipality, it was decided to build it to the geographical centre of the municipality. They settled on Mihailova puustus (wasteland), at the intersection of the historic Võru-Petseri and Pankjavitsa-Kiirova-Orava-Räpina roads. The present rural municipality building is the second of the buildings built for that purpose. The first building built specially to become Meremäe rural municipality building is now the home to Meremäe Youth Centre. The new rural municipality building was finished in autumn of 1932 and was considered very spacious at the time, noticed and praised by the journalists of that time.

== New building ==
On 31 January 1929, the owner of Unkipa farm and a citizen of Meremäe rural municipality Sement Prokofi p. Põhja and Efim Liivik, the deputy for Meremäe rural municipality community signed a contract of gift in Petseri with the public notary, Johan Piip, according to which Semen Põhja grants Meremäe rural municipality community a vacant plot the size of 0.575 hectares under the name “Meremäe rural municipality building”. With it, the rural municipality acquired the land unit beneath the building. Developmental works were launched and from the 6 March 1931 issue of “Technology Magazine” one could read: “the Road Office has confirmed the new building plan for the Meremäe rural municipality, with Anatoli Rozanski, fully trained engineer as the author”. Soon after that the building began and on 8 September 1932, the rural municipality mayor opened the door of the safe in his spacious office. The building itself, with sizes 23 x 11.5 m cost 76,792.33 euros. It was built with the help of the locals (who provided construction materials as well as workforce). Inauguration of the new rural municipality building took place on the 25 September 1932. Meremäe rural municipality 10th birthday celebrations took place at the same time.
