= Kuksina Hill =

Hill in Estonia

- Kuksina mägi
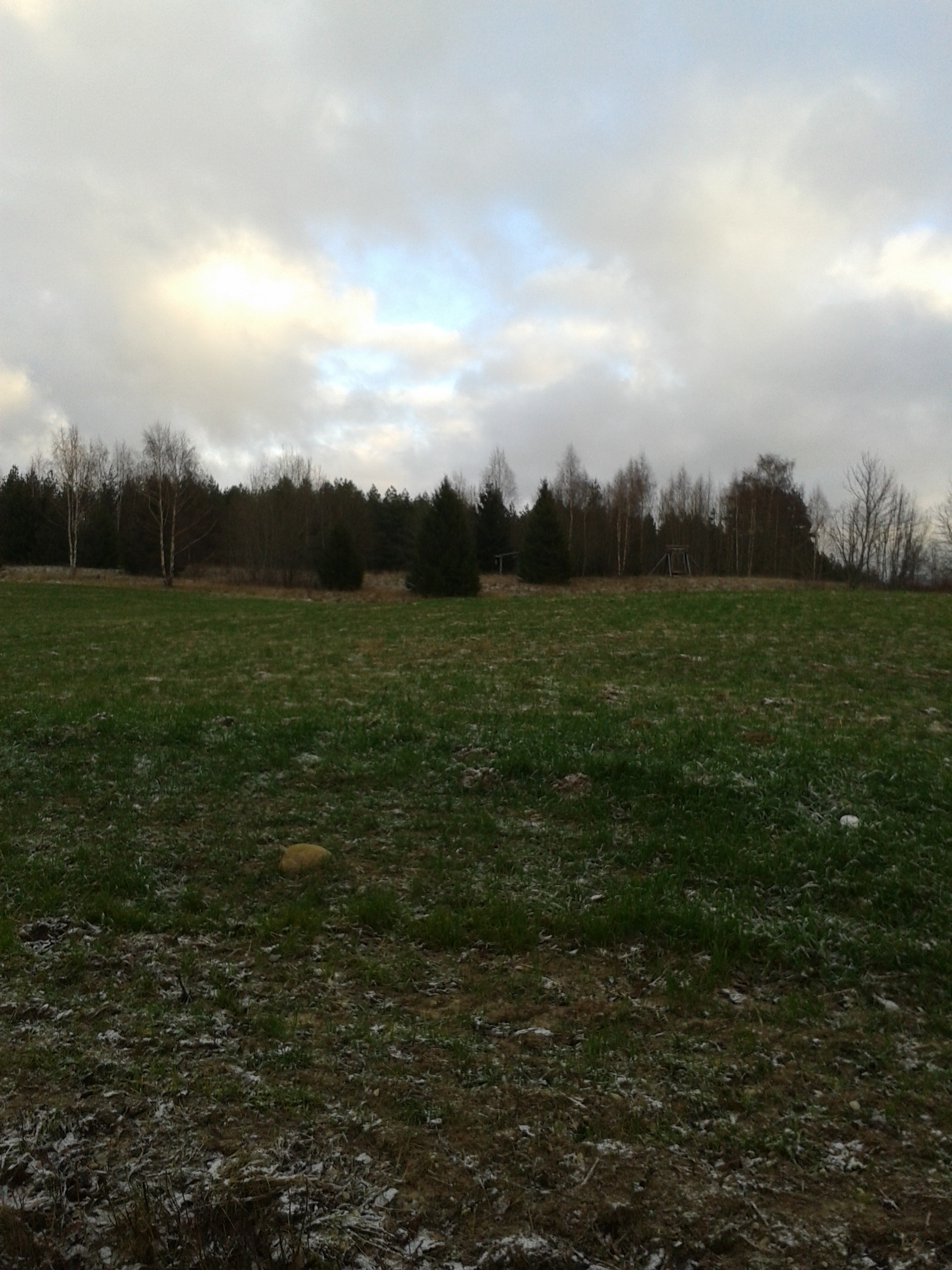
- Kuksina Hill

Highest point
- Elevation: 212 m (696 ft)
- Coordinates: 57°43′37.44″N 27°23′38.77″E

Geography
- Location: Meremäe Parish, Võru County, Estonia

Kuksina Hill is the highest top of Vaaksaare upland, the eastern part of Haanja upland, with a height of 212 m over sea level. Kuksina Hill is the highest top of Meremäe rural municipality.

Vaaksaare uplands is a moraine hillock, where agricultural patches alternate with forests and meadows. Kuksina Hill is situated in Kuksina village and is covered by forest. As a tourist object, the highest hill of Meremäe rural municipality is not as important, as Meremäe Hill in the same uplands has a viewing tower near the top. North from the Vaaksaare uplands is fertile loam plain, predominantly arable that reaches up to the Piusa River Valley.
