= Obinitsa Village Centre =

Multi-purpose building in Estonia

- Obinitsa külakeskus
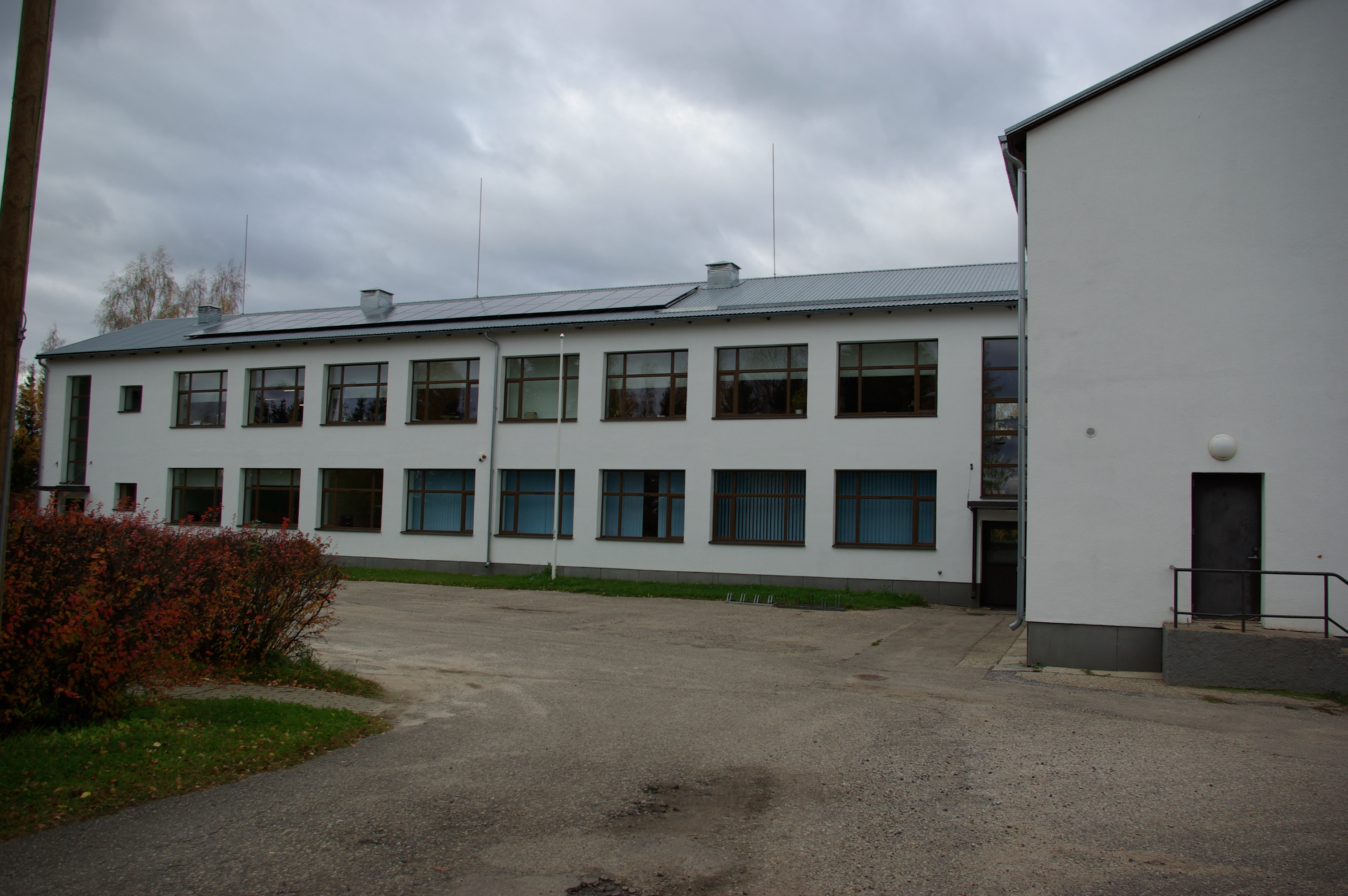
- Obinitsa Village Centre
- Interactive map of the Obinitsa Village Centre area

General information
- Location: Obinitsa, Estonia
- Coordinates: 57°48′43″N 27°26′45″E
- Completed: 1963
- Renovated: 2009

Obinitsa Village Centre is a building in Obinitsa village, Setomaa Parish, Võru County in southeastern Estonia. Obinitsa kindergarten, Obinitsa library, gym, fitness studio, dressing rooms and washrooms as well as some rental areas are situated in the building.

Obinitsa village centre was originally built as a building for the Incomplete Secondary School of Obinitsa during 1962–1963. 170 children began their studies in the building in 1963. Historically, the school in Obinitsa had been operating ever since 1890. Obinitsa Basic School continued to operate in the same building. In 2004, Meremäe and Obinitsa basic schools were joined together as Meremäe-Obinitsa Basic School; lessons were held in two buildings: In Meremäe and Obinitsa. Since the autumn of 2008, Meremäe-Obinitsa Basic School carried on its work in Meremäe School building only and Obinitsa school building had no use for the most part of it.

In 2009, the building was renovated and turned into Obinitsa Village Centre. Building and renovating the whole complex cost 497,841 euros, of which 423,165 euros was provided by Enterprise Estonia. Renovation was done by AS Tartu Ehitus. Altogether, 1372m² of building ground was renovated. The building became home to a kindergarten and library, a gym was opened, as well as a fitness studio, dressing and washrooms.
