= Setomaa Tourist Farm =

Tourism farm in Estonia

Coordinates: 57°44′25″N 27°25′51″E

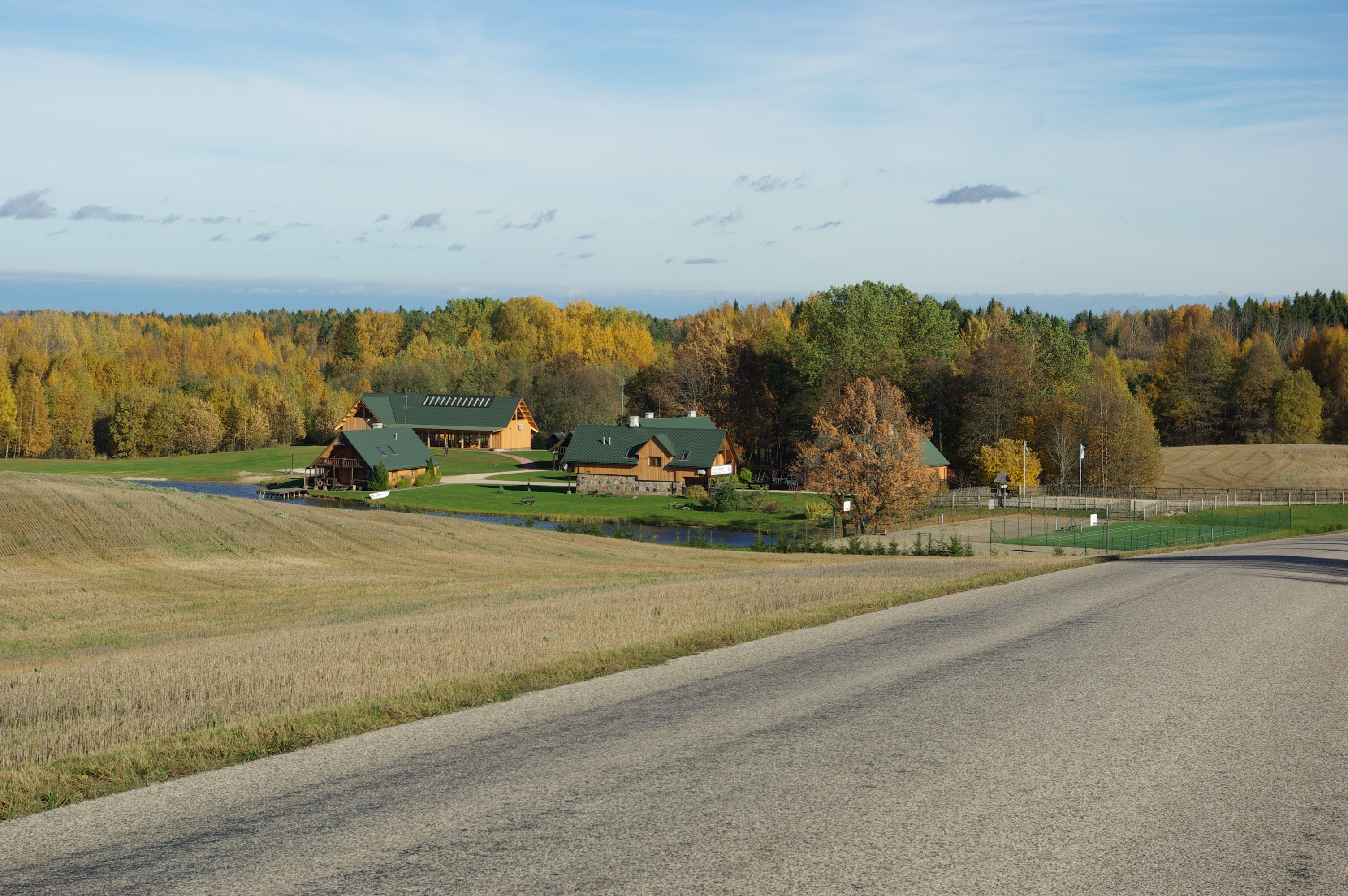
Setomaa Tourist Farm

Setomaa Tourist Farm is a tourist farm in Kalatsova village, Setomaa Parish, Võru County in southeastern Estonia. The tourist farm is situated in Mäealodsõ farm. In 1999, the hundred-year-old farm was renovated, first as a summer home, later as a place offering accommodation. There are 32 places. The rooms in log cabins carry Seto names: Mari tarõ, Sootska tarõ, Kullo tarõ, Lapi tarõ etc. Tourist farm offers accommodation, organising of seminars, parties and company events. Visitors can swim in the farm, there are playgrounds, a smoke sauna and a party hall.
