= Rein Järvelill =

Estonian politician (born 1966)

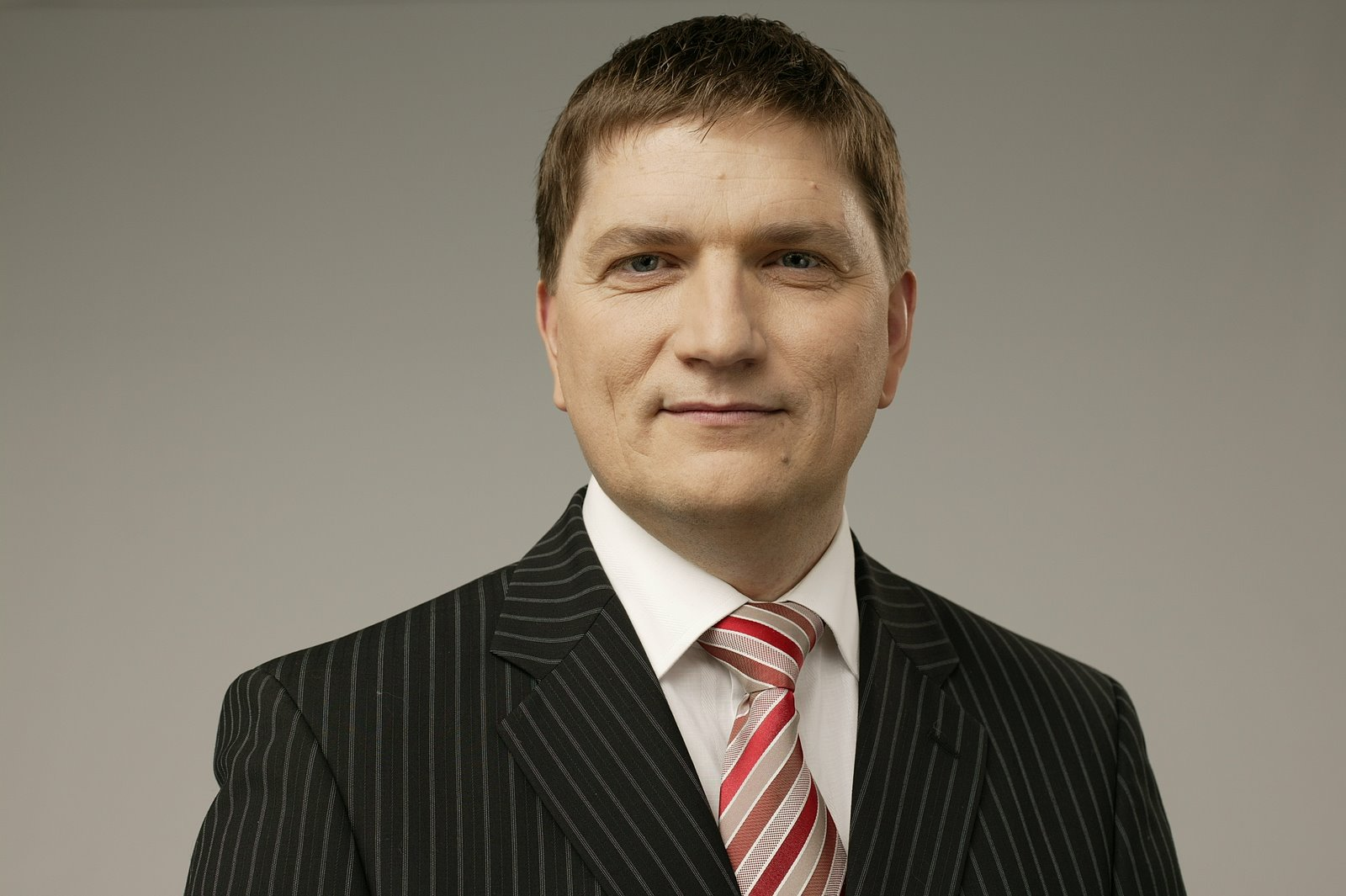
Rein Järvelill

Rein Järvelill (born 1966 in Uusvada, Võru County) is an Estonian politician. He was a member of IX Riigikogu.

Rein Järvelill graduated from the Estonian University of Life Sciences in 1994 with a degree in forestry. From 1994 to 1997, he studied law at the University of Tartu.

Järvelill was the mayor of Värska from 2012 to 2017. He was formerly the municipal governor of Meremäe Parish.

He has been a member of Estonian Social Democratic Party.
