= Kõõru sacrificial spring =

Spring in Estonia

Coordinates: 57°50′8″N 27°26′39″E

Kõõru sacrificial spring, also known as Müräläte, is a spring in Võru County, Meremäe rural municipality, in Kõõru village in Estonia. The spring is under protection as a cultural monument. The spring is situated between Kõõru and Talka village, on the right by Talka Stream. According to the folk myth, the place is the location for an ancient stronghold. Archaeological excavations have been done in the area, but there have not been any findings.
