= Lake Hilläkeste =

Lake in Estonia

- Hilläkeste järv (Estonian)
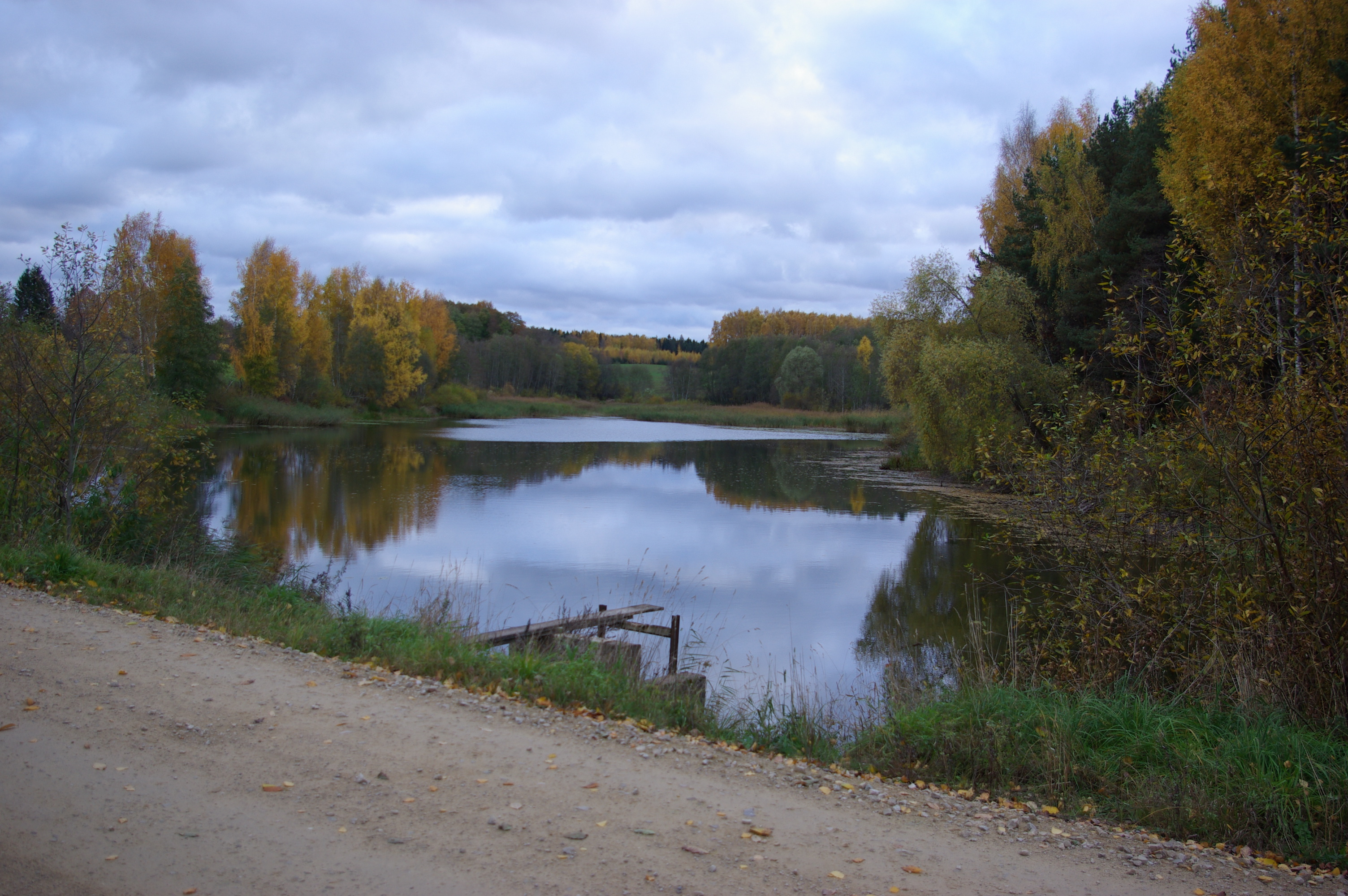
- Lake Hilläkeste, 2013

- Location within Estonia
- Location: Estonia
- Coordinates: 57°45′21″N 27°26′47″E
- Catchment area: 47,800 square kilometers (18,500 sq mi)
- Basin countries: Estonia
- Max. length: 370 meters (1,210 ft)
- Surface area: 2.5 hectares (6.2 acres)
- Average depth: 2.1 meters (6 ft 11 in)
- Water volume: 55,000 cubic meters (1,900,000 cu ft)
- Shore length^{1}: 850 meters (2,790 ft)
- Surface elevation: 130.5 meters (428 ft)
- Settlements: Hilläkeste
- ^{1} Shore length is not a well-defined measure.

Lake Hilläkeste (Estonian: Hilläkeste järv, also known as Meremäe järv, Meremäe paisjärv, or Tsirgu paisjärv) is a lake in Estonia. It is located in the village of Hilläkeste in Setomaa Parish, Võru County.

== Physical description ==
The lake has an area of 2.5 hectares (6.2 acres). The lake has an average depth of 2.1 meters (6 ft 11 in). It is 370 meters (1,210 ft) long, and its shoreline measures 850 meters (2,790 ft). It has a volume of 55,000 cubic meters (1,900,000 cu ft).

== Recreation ==
Lake Hilläkeste is a recreational area for the people in the Meremäe region, where they swim and go fishing. There is a small sandy beach and there used to be a swimming pier. The government of the rural municipality of Meremäe has started a process to claim the lake as public property.
