= Obinitsa Chapel =

Chapel in Setomaa, Estonia

- Obinitsa tsässon
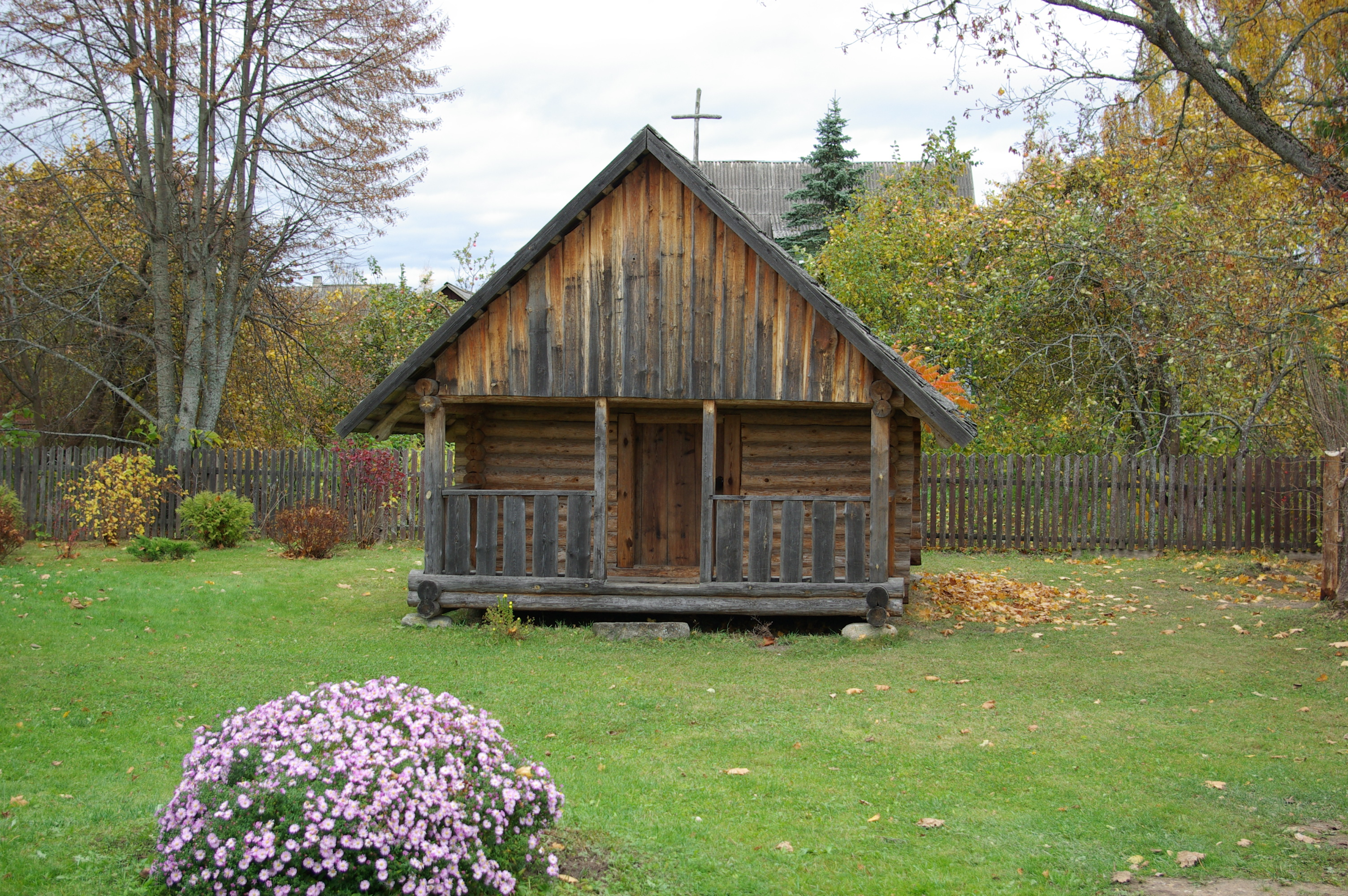

Religion
- Affiliation: Estonian Apostolic Orthodox Church
- Year consecrated: 2007

Location
- Location: Obinitsa, Setomaa Parish, Estonia
- Interactive map of Obinitsa Chapel
- Coordinates: 57°46′12.28″N 27°26′33.7″E

Architecture
- Materials: wood

Obinitsa Chapel (Estonian: Obinitsa tsässon) is a small Seto chapel in the village of Obinitsa, Setomaa Parish, Võru County in southeastern Estonia. It is located next to Obinitsa museum.

== General information ==
This small chapel is a Passover (19 August) chapel. It was built in 2007, by Ain Raal. The building is used on Passover day, other times it is open for introducing Seto culture to tourists, as it is situated next to Obinitsa muuseumitarõ and the key is in the museum.

== Building data ==
Obinitsa Chapel is built from pine beams which are unhewn from the inside as well as from the outside. The building has an entrance-room that is supported by poles and the main part of it is made from logs. The outer measurements of the chapel without corner cross-beams are 347 x 560 centimetres, of which the entrance-room makes up 130 cm. The entrance-room does not have a ceiling or a gate, the fence is about a metre high and made from upright unedged boards and fitted in by a few centimetre gaps. The gables are made from boards with the edges placed on top of each other. The chapel stands on granite stones. The height of the building (the part made from beams) is 194 cm and the height up to the ridge is 383 cm. The roof has a double shingle cover. The ridge has a simple round-timber juniper cross. There is no ceiling on the building and the floor is made from wide boards. There is a door made from wide boards in the front wall that opens on the inside. The building is locked with a large padlock. There are no windows, but on the southern side, in the middle of the wall, there is an opening for a cauldron that can be closed with a trapdoor.

== Furnishing ==
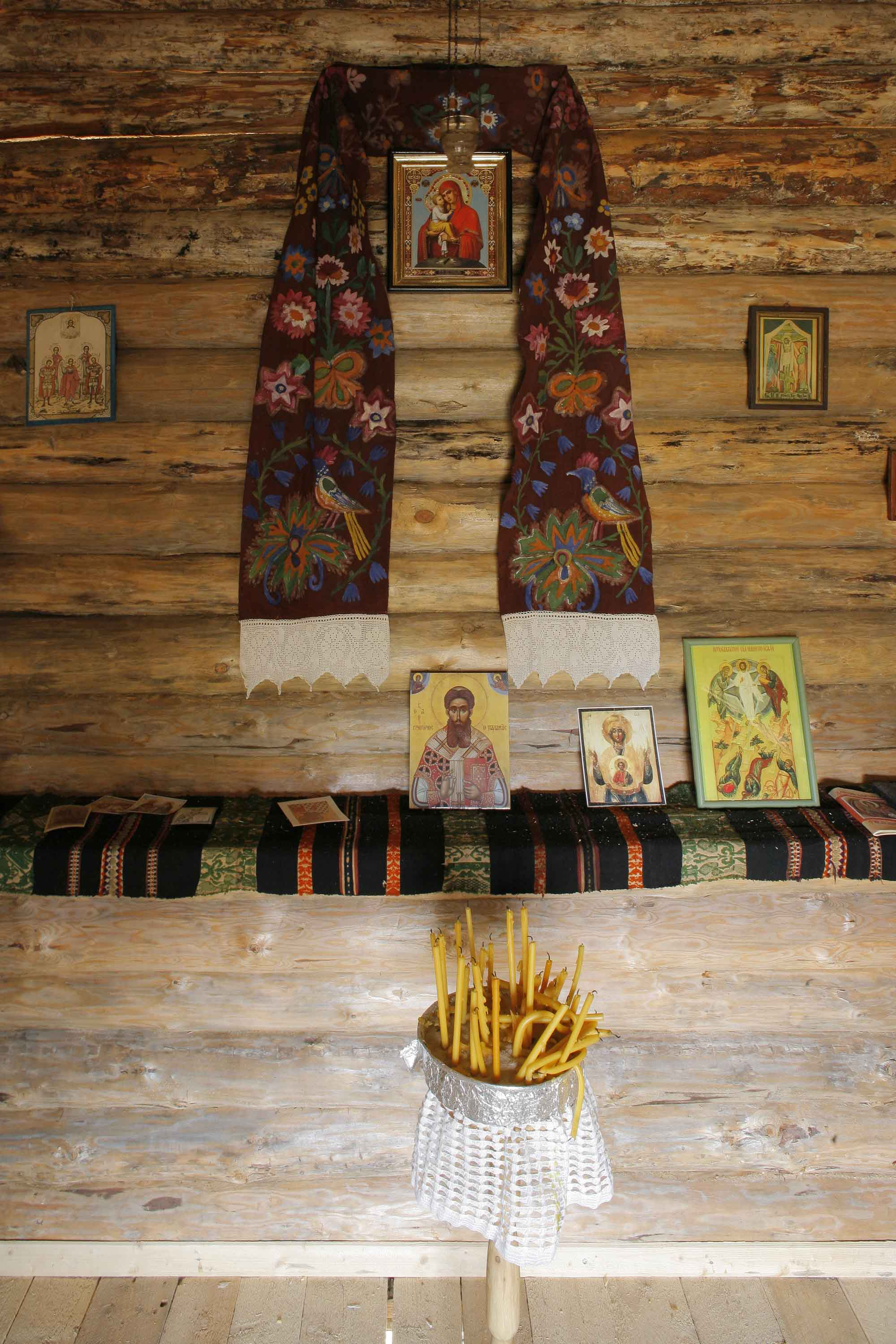
Interior view of Obinitsa Chapel in 2008

A simple, narrow icon table is in the rear wall of the chapel, covered by a dark red knitted icon scarf (Estonian: pühaserätt). Newer printed icons are placed on the icon table and on the rear wall. A painted icon scarf is hung above the icon in the middle of the wall. There is also a turned wooden candleholder and an analoi. A few traditional woven rugs are on the floor.
