= Viro, Estonia =

Village in Estonia

- Village
- Location within Estonia
- Coordinates: 57.756666666667°N 27.450277777778°E
- Country: Estonia
- County: Võru County
- Parish: Setomaa Parish

Area
  - Total: 0.3 km^{2} (0.12 sq mi)

Population (2011)
  - Total: 3
- Time zone: UTC+2 (EET)
  - Summer (DST): UTC+3 (EEST)
- EHAK code: 9384

Viro is a village in Setomaa Parish, Võru County in Estonia.

According to the 2011 census, the village had 3 inhabitants, all Estonians.

In 2020, the village was 0.3km^{2}(0.1m^{2})

== History ==
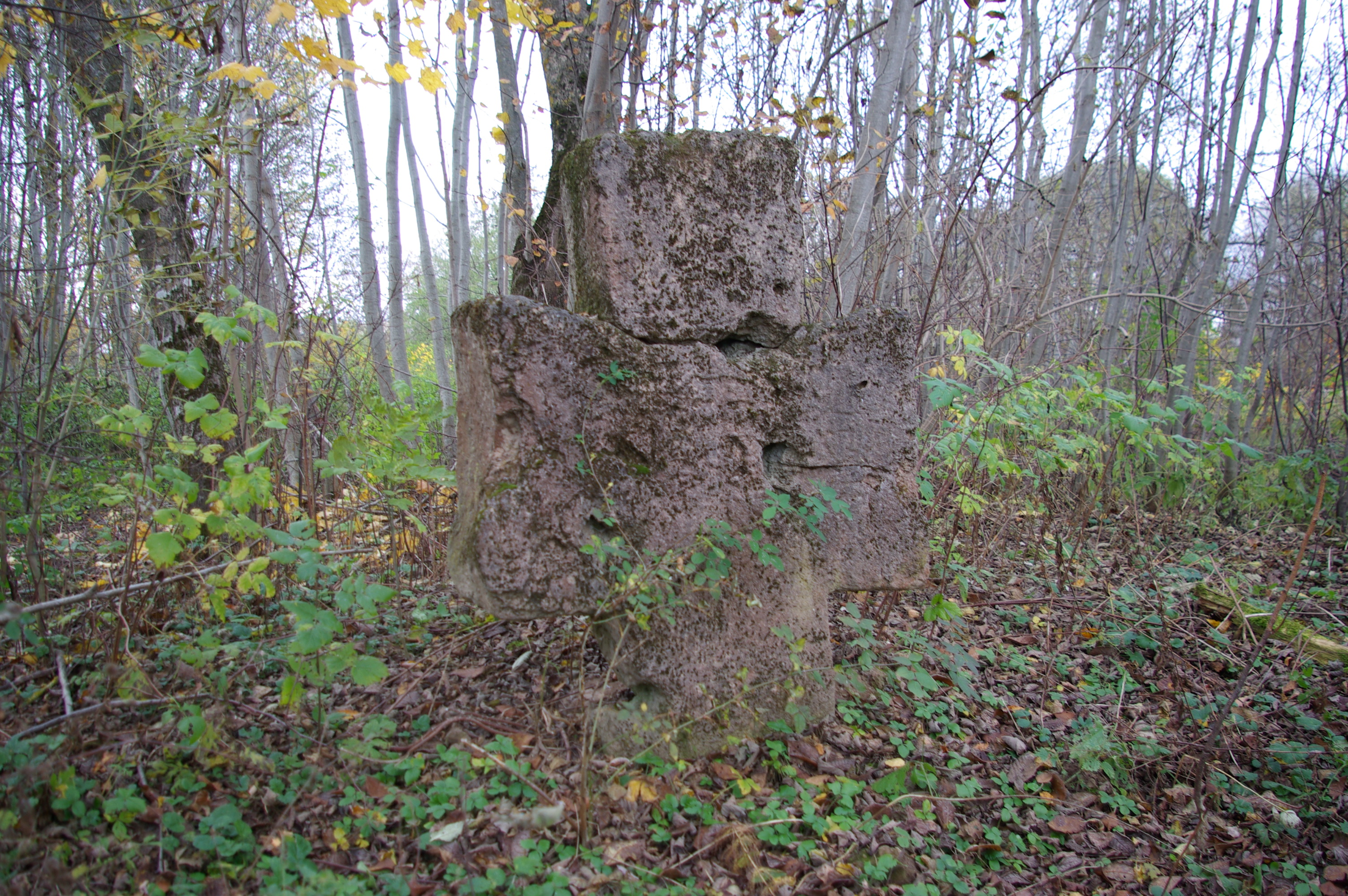
The Viro Stone Cross

There was a chapel in the village. A limestones cross, probably erected in the 15th century, marks its location.

In 2000, there were 4 inhabitants.

Before the administrative reform of Estonian local governments in 2017, the village belonged to Meremäe Parish.
