= Make wall =

Outcrop in Estonia

Coordinates: 57°45′5″N 27°21′22″E

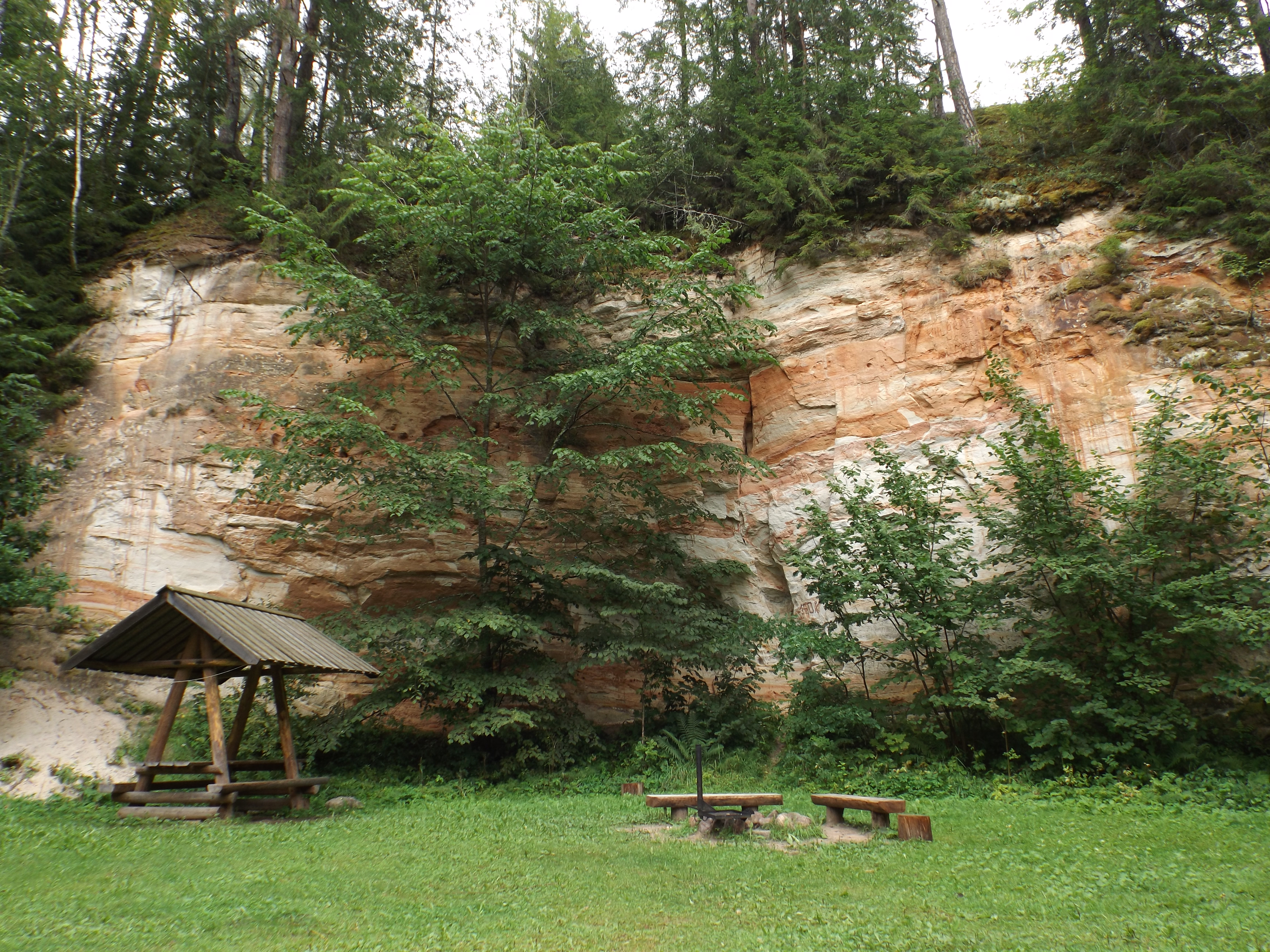
Make wall pictured in 2023

Make wall (also known as Möldre wall) is a sandstone outcrop on the bank of the Piusa River in Estonia, up to 12 metres high, the height of the bank stretches up to 17 metres.

Make wall is one of the protected natural features of the Piusa River ancient valley landscape protection area. The outcrop is situated in Vastseliina rural municipality, about 300 metres downstream from Make mill in Möldri village. Make mill was named for Hendrik Make, who established the watermill and a sawframe in 1883. Since 1900, the mill had an operating wool industry on the second floor. Make wall is one of the highest and most beautiful outcrops in the southern part of the protected area.

Make wall is an Upper Devonian sandstone outcrop of the Gauja Formation. The Gauja Formation is up to 183 metres thick and consists of quartz sand, multicolour clay, and fine-grained mellow clastic rocks, that has yielded remnants of fish and flora. The Gauja Formation sands settled in the retreating sea during the 50-70 million years of the Devonian period (began 410 million years ago). As Devonian sandstone has relatively crumbly structure, the sandstone outcrops surrender to erosion fairly easily.
