= Jaanimäe, Rõuge Parish =

Village in Estonia

Jaanimäe
- Location within Estonia
- Coordinates: 57°45′23″N 27°1′50″E
- Country: Estonia
- County: Võru County
- Time zone: UTC+2 (EET)

Jaanimäe is a settlement in Rõuge Parish, Võru County in southeastern Estonia.
