= Miikse graveyard =

Cemetery in Estonia

Coordinates: 57°42′35″N 27°23′44″E

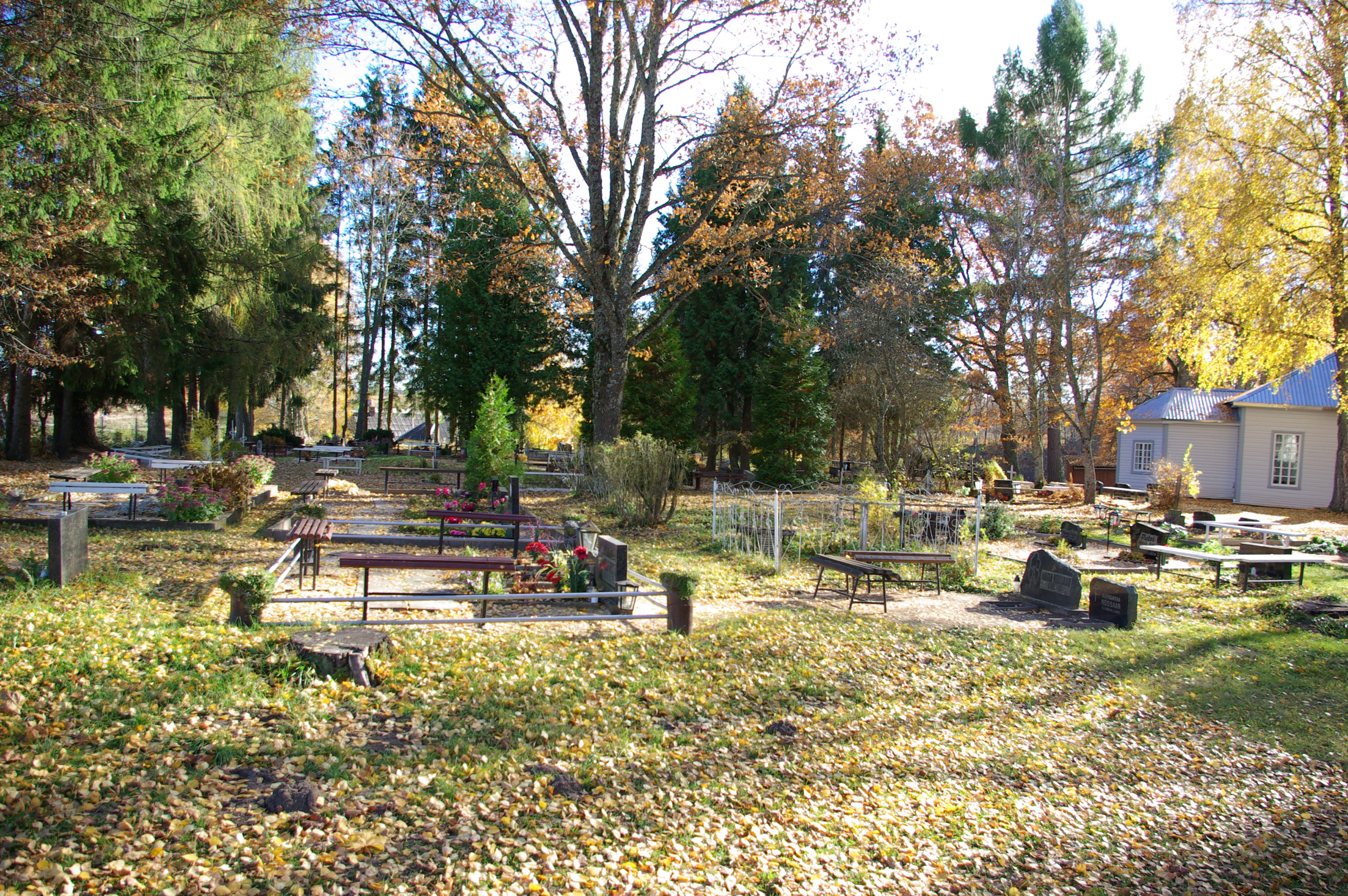
Miikse graveyard

Miikse graveyard is a graveyard in Setomaa and by the administrative division of today is situated in Meremäe rural municipality in Miikse village in Estonia. The graveyard is the public property of Meremäe rural municipality, but belongs under the Meeksi Estonian Apostolic Orthodox Church of St. John the Baptist. Miikse graveyard began to evolve in 1944, next to the common grave for soldiers of the Red Army who had fallen in 1944. After World War II, when Luhamaa orthodox congregation assistant church fell apart, Meeksi Estonian Apostolic Orthodox Church of St. John the Baptist was built in the graveyard, by the authorization of the Commissary of the Russian Orthodox Affaires that was situated by the former Estonian SSR Council of Ministers.
