= List of individual trees in Estonia =

This is the list of individual trees located in Estonia. These individual trees located in Estonia are notable because of their natural (e.g. the highest, the thickest, the oldest), historical or mythological context.

Name	Species	Location (county, parish)	Further info	Image
Tamme-Lauri oak	Quercus robur	Võru County, Antsla Parish	The thickest and the oldest tree in Estonia	
Church of Our Lady of Kazan's poplar	Populus nigra	Harju, Tallinn	The oldest and thickest poplar in Estonia.	
Ginkgo in Süda Street	Ginkgo biloba	Harju County, Tallinn	The thickest ginkgo in Estonia	
Kelch's Lime		Harju County, Tallinn		
Kernu juniper	Juniperus communis	Harju County, Saue Parish	Under protection	
Meremäe pines	Pinus sylvestris	Võru County, Setomaa Parish		
Pühajärv War oak	Quercus robur	Valga County, Otepää Parish		
Rasina willow	Salix alba	Põlva County, Põlva Parish	The thickest willow in Estonia or even in Europe	
Tsirgu pine	Pinus sylvestris	Võru County, Setomaa Parish	Under protection	
Tsuura spruce	Picea abies	Valga County, Otepää Parish	One of the thickest in Estonia	

== See also ==
- List of individual trees
