= Vaarkali, Rõuge Parish =

Village in Estonia

Vaarkali
- Location within Estonia
- Coordinates: 57°45′0″N 27°28′0″E
- Country: Estonia
- County: Võru County
- Time zone: UTC+2 (EET)

Varkali is a settlement in Rõuge Parish, Võru County in southeastern Estonia.
