= Kalatsova =

Village in Estonia

- Location within Estonia
- Coordinates: 57°44′28″N 27°24′39″E
- Country: Estonia
- County: Võru County
- Time zone: UTC+2 (EET)

Kalatsova is a settlement in Setomaa Parish, Võru County in southeastern Estonia.
