= Obinitsa =

Village in Estonia

- Village
- Location in Estonia
- Coordinates: 57°48′35″N 27°26′33″E
- Country: Estonia
- County: Võru County
- Municipality: Setomaa Parish

Area
  - Total: 2,810 km^{2} (1,080 sq mi)

Population (2022 )
  - Total: 147
  - Density: 52.3/km^{2} (135/sq mi)

Obinitsa (also known as Obiniste, Abinitsa, or Kirikmäe) is a village in Setomaa Parish, Võru County, southeastern Estonia. It has a population of 147 (as of 1 January 2022).

Meremäe–Obinitsa Primary School was closed in 2009, and since then the building has been used as a nursing home.

Obinitsa was the Finno-Ugric Capital of Culture in 2015.

== Old Obinitsa Church ==
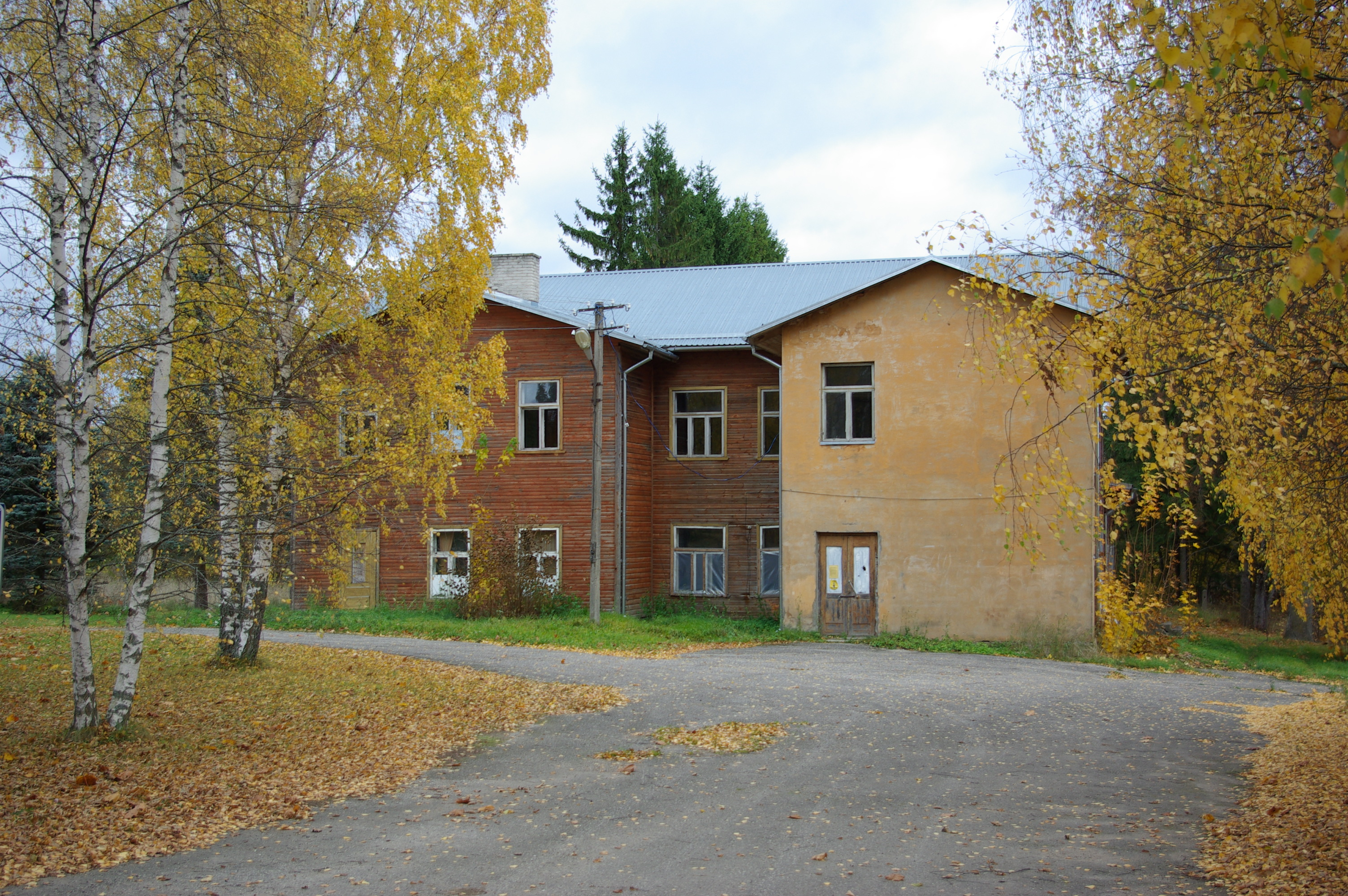
Old Obinitsa Church

The former church in Obinitsa was an Estonian Apostolic Orthodox Church. On 16 December 1894, land was allocated for a church and school by the Obinitsa village community. Construction of the church began in 1896, and it was consecrated in 1897. The church was closed in 1950. The bell tower was dismantled, and the building was turned into a school.

== Gallery ==
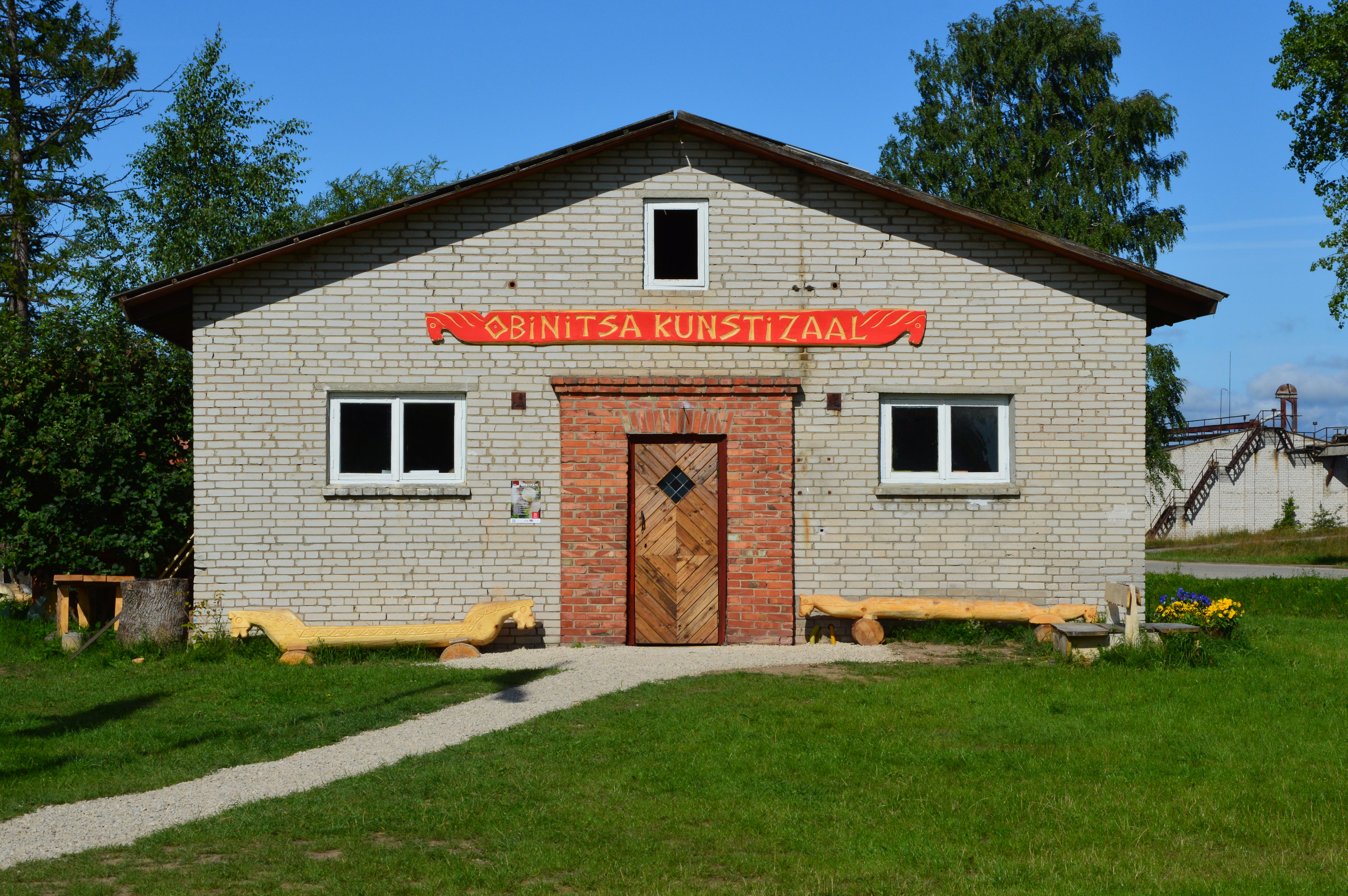
Obinitsa Art Hall

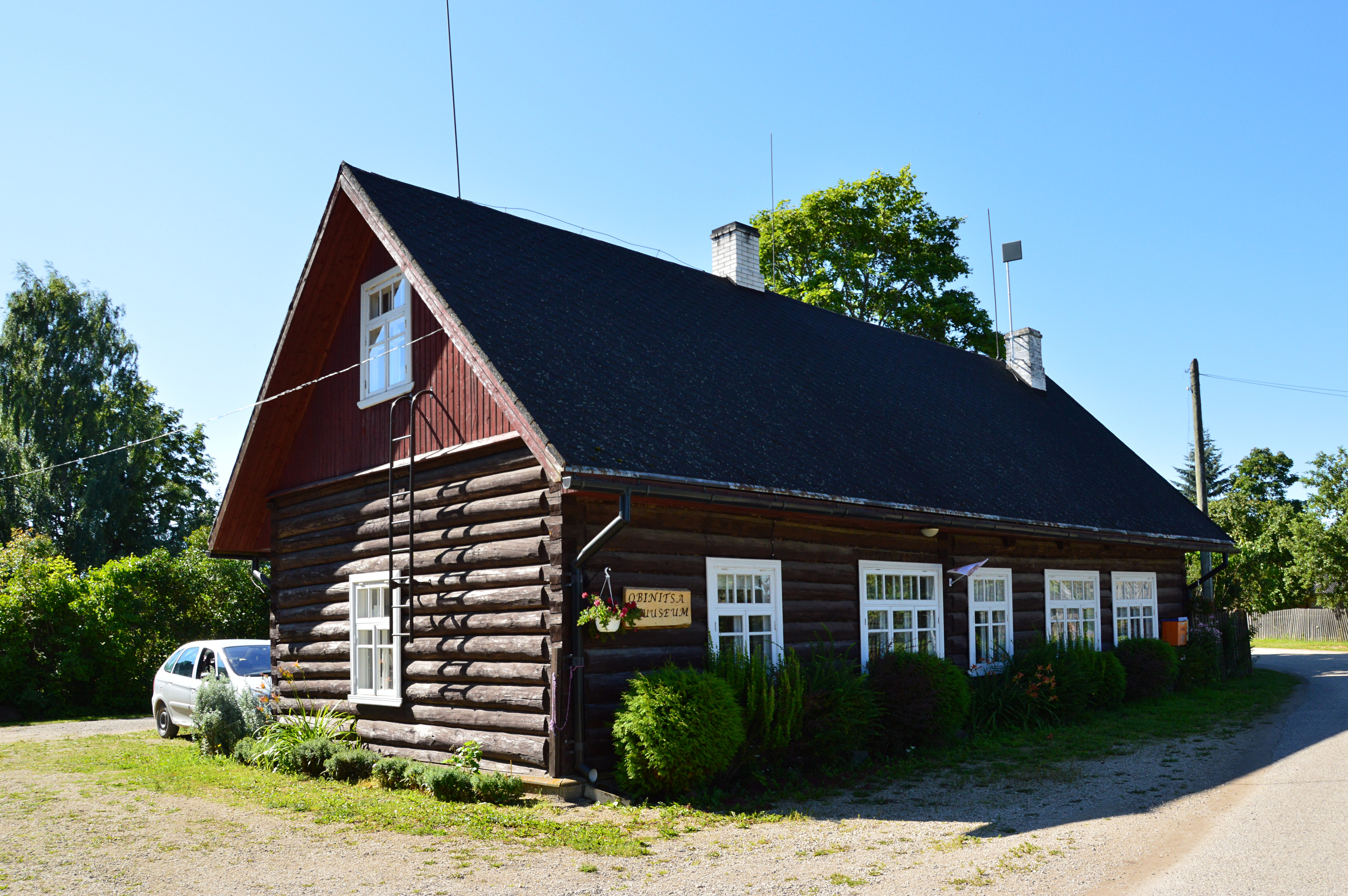
Obinitsa Museum

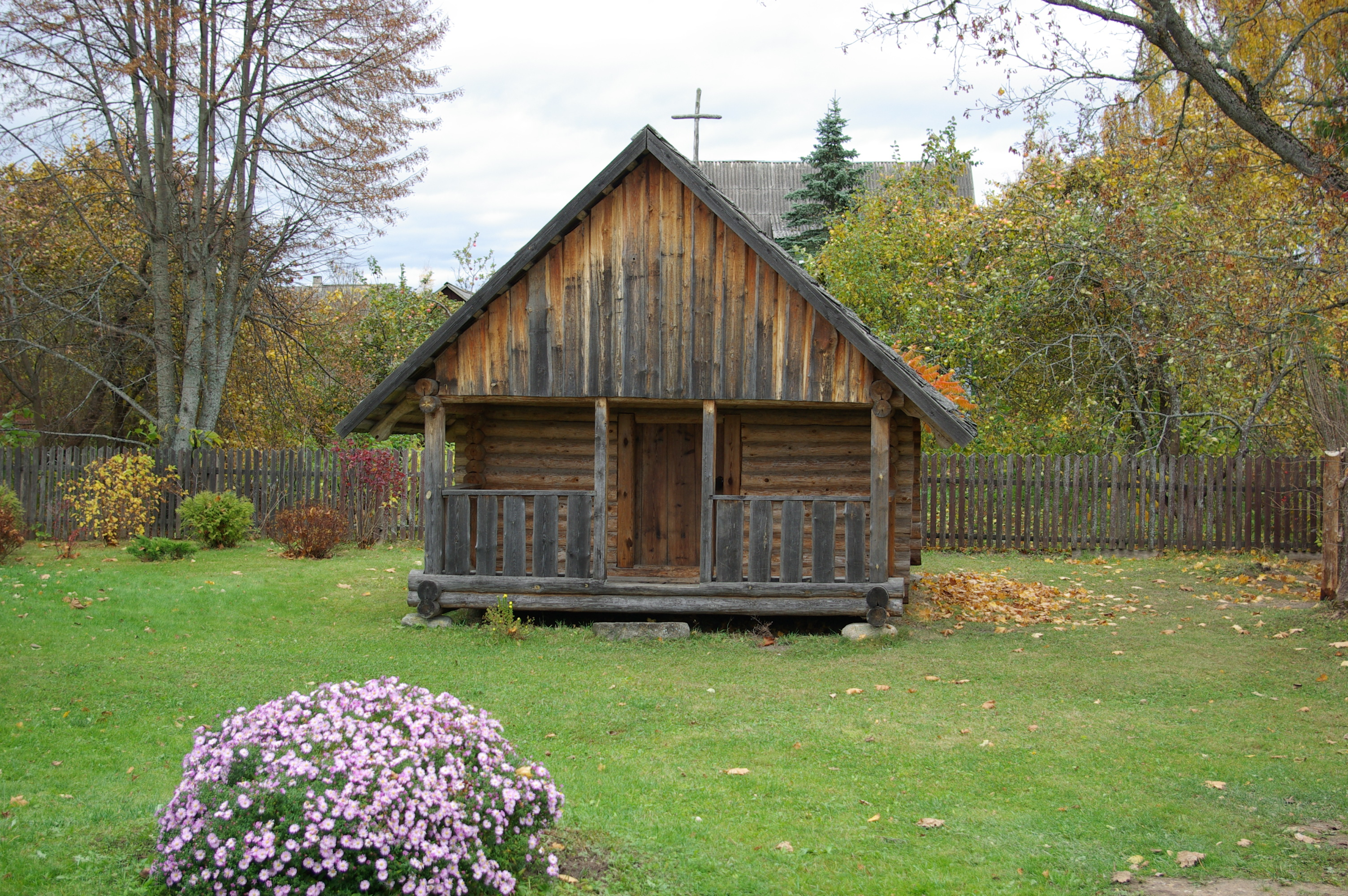
Obinitsa Chapel

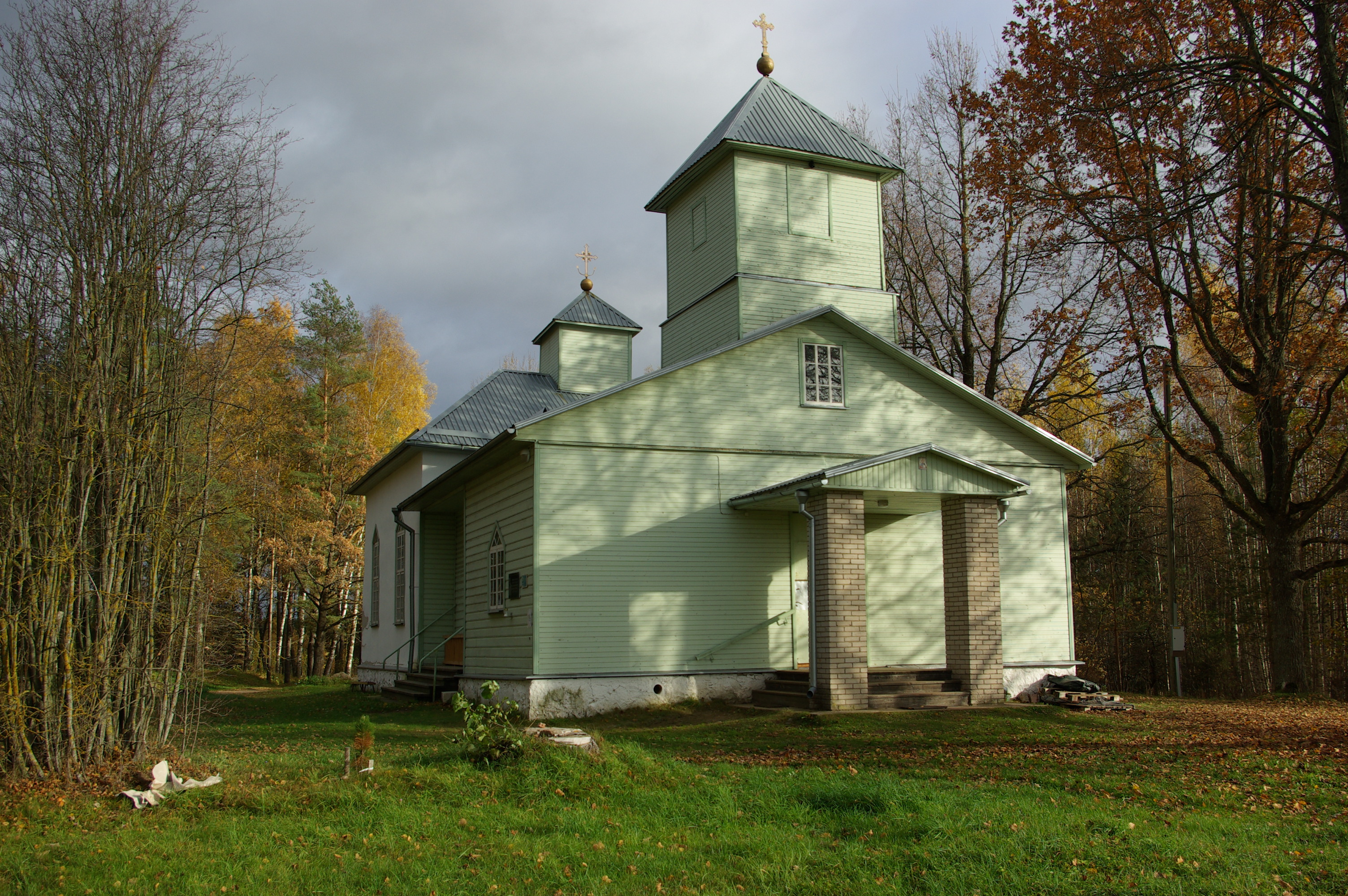
Transfiguration Church

== See also ==
- Transfiguration Church, Obinitsa
