= Meremäe =

Village in Estonia

- Village
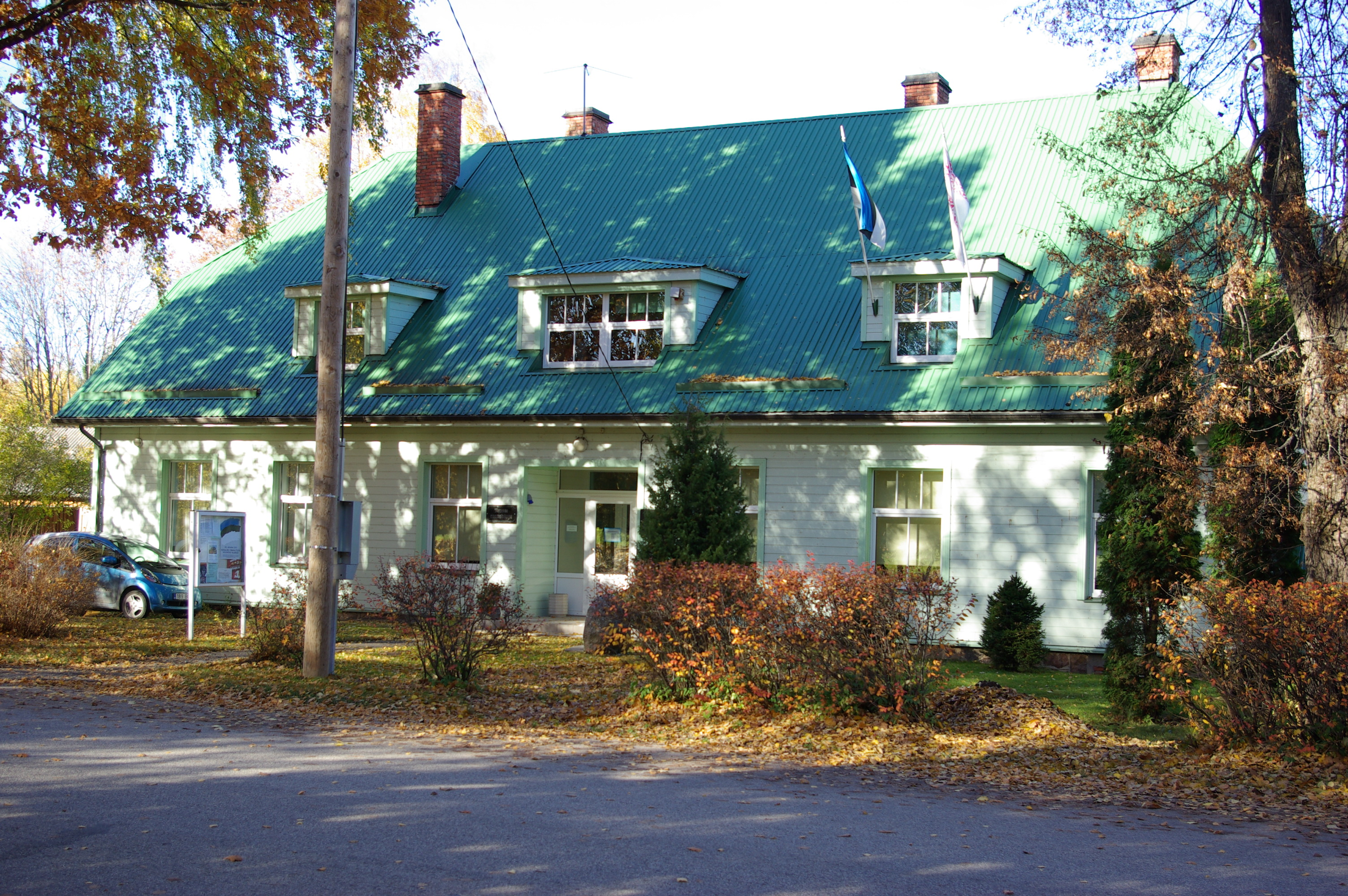
- Meremäe parish house

- Location in Estonia
- Coordinates: 57°44′52″N 27°27′22″E
- Country: Estonia
- County: Võru County
- Municipality: Setomaa Parish

Population (2011 Census)
  - Total: 146

Meremäe (also known as Mihailova, Mihailovo) is a village in Setomaa Parish, Võru County, southeastern Estonia. The biggest settlements nearby include Vastseliina (10 km (6 mi) west), town of Võru (29 km (18 mi) northwest) and Russian town Pechory (11 km (7 mi) northeast). As of the 2011 census, the village's population was 146.

There are primary school, library and a society centre operating in Meremäe.

Meremäe is also home to archaeological monument no. 13598, Uusvada ludimägi.
