= Lüübnitsa Umbjärv =

Lake in Estonia

- Location within Estonia
- Coordinates: 58.0709144°N 27.5750176°E
- Basin countries: Estonia
- Max. length: 580 meters (1,900 ft)
- Surface area: 11.2 hectares (28 acres)
- Average depth: 1.4 meters (4 ft 7 in)
- Max. depth: 2.1 meters (6 ft 11 in)
- Water volume: 154,000 cubic meters (5,400,000 cu ft)
- Shore length^{1}: 1,390 meters (4,560 ft)
- Surface elevation: 29.8 meters (98 ft)
- ^{1} Shore length is not a well-defined measure.

Lüübnitsa Umbjärv (also 2. Võõpsu järv or Lüügnitse Umbjärv) is a lake in Estonia. It is located in the village of Lüübnitsa in Setomaa Parish, Võru County.

== Physical description ==
The lake has an area of 11.2 hectares (28 acres). The lake has an average depth of 1.4 meters (4 ft 7 in) and a maximum depth of 2.1 meters (6 ft 11 in). It is 580 meters (1,900 ft) long, and its shoreline measures 1,390 meters (4,560 ft). It has a volume of 154,000 cubic meters (5,400,000 cu ft).

== Names ==
The name Lüübnitsa Umbjärv distinguishes the lake from other lakes named Umbjärv in Estonia—for example, Beresje Umbjärv about 1 kilometer (0.62 mi) to the north in the village of Beresje, and various other lakes simply named Umbjärv. The name Umbjärv is derived from the Estonian common noun umbjärv 'endorheic lake, lake with no (surface inlet) or outlet' (cf. Finnish umpijärvi). The name 2. Võõpsu järv (lit. 'Lake Võõpsu Number 2') is paired with the name 1. Võõpsu järv (lit. 'Lake Võõpsu Number 1'), an alternate name for Beresje Umbjärv.

== See also ==
- List of lakes of Estonia
