= Luhamaa =

Locality at the border of Estonia and Russia

- Location within Estonia
- Coordinates: 57°37′30″N 27°21′41″E
- Country: Estonia
- County: Võru County
- Time zone: UTC+2 (EET)

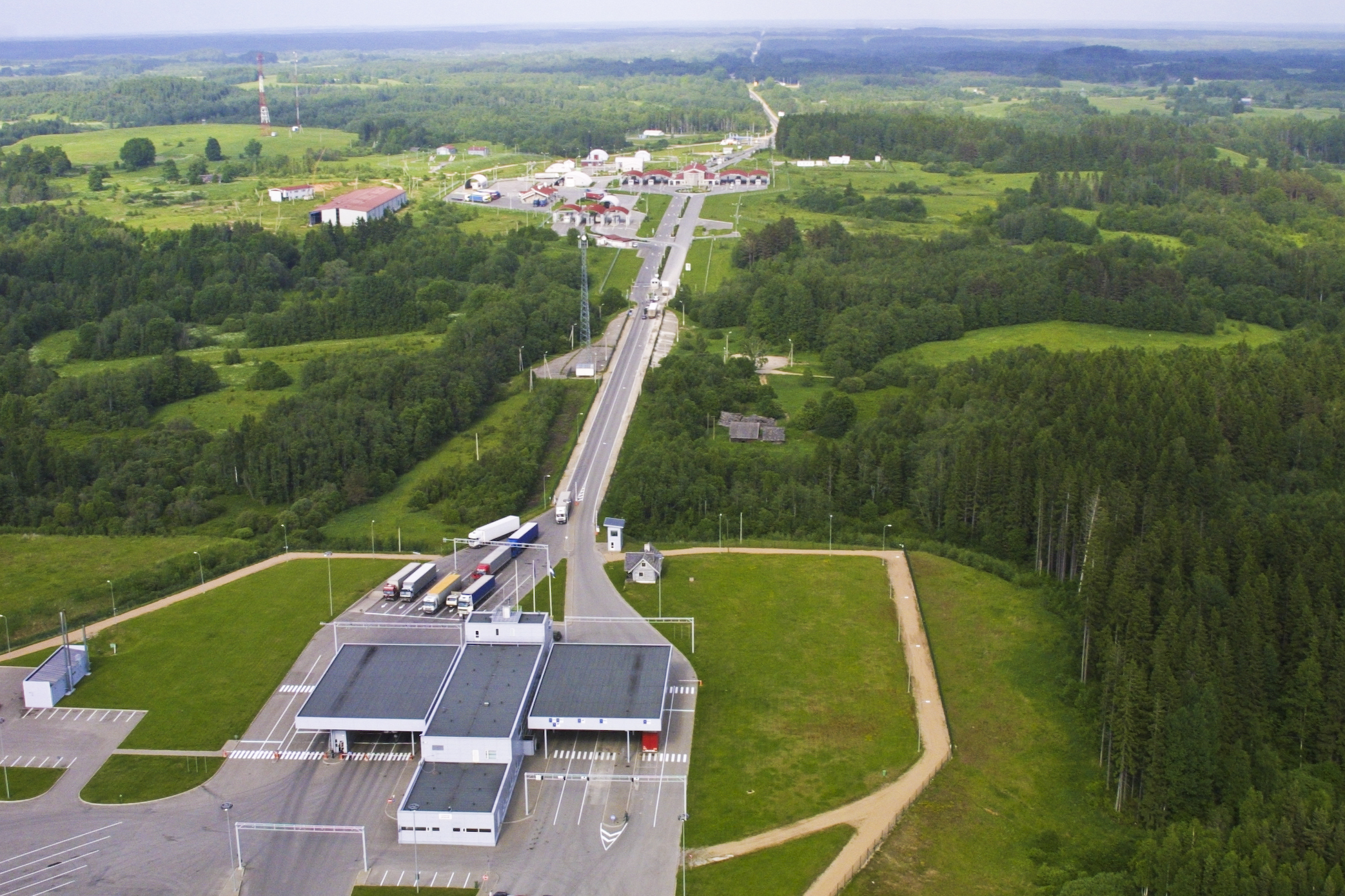
Border crossing in Luhamaa

Luhamaa is a small area in Setomaa Parish, Võru County in southeastern Estonia, on the Russian border. The Luhamaa border crossing is located on the European route E77 (road from Pskov to Riga).

The official Luhamaa village was abolished in 1997 by dividing the lands between Hindsa, Määsi and Pruntova villages. The border crossing is officially located on the territory of Lütä village.

On 5 September 2014 Eston Kohver, an Estonian counterintelligence officer, was kidnapped at gunpoint from the border checkpoint, while he was in the process of interdicting a crossborder crime. The abductors had jammed communications and used smoke grenades. The abducted officer was taken to Russia. Later on the same day the Russian Federal Security Service (FSB) claimed the responsibility for the abduction of the officer. The FSB, however, maintains that he was taken from within Russian territory.
