= Toodsi =

Toodsi may refer to several places in Estonia:

- Toodsi, Rõuge Parish, village in Võru County, Estonia
- Toodsi, Setomaa Parish, village in Võru County, Estonia
