= Lake Pabra =

Lake in Estonia

- Pabra järv (Estonian)
- Location within Estonia
- Coordinates: 57.6090°N 27.3920°E
- Basin countries: Estonia, Russia
- Max. length: 2,050 meters (6,730 ft)
- Surface area: 95.9 hectares (237 acres)
- Average depth: 2.4 meters (7 ft 10 in)
- Max. depth: 3.6 meters (12 ft)
- Water volume: 2,325,000 cubic meters (82,100,000 cu ft)
- Shore length^{1}: 6,280 meters (20,600 ft)
- Surface elevation: 171.4 meters (562 ft)
- Islands: 2
- ^{1} Shore length is not a well-defined measure.

Lake Pabra (Estonian: Pabra järv, also Kossa järv, Bobrova järv, or Lidva järv; Russian: озеро Бобровское, ozero Bobrovskoe) is a lake in Estonia and Russia. It is mostly located in the village of Toodsi in Setomaa Parish, Võru County, Estonia, with a smaller part in Russia's Pechorsky District.

== Physical description ==
The lake has an area of 95.9 hectares (237 acres), and it has two islands with a combined area of 0.2 hectares (0.49 acres). The lake has an average depth of 2.4 meters (7 ft 10 in) and a maximum depth of 3.6 meters (12 ft). It is 2,050 meters (6,730 ft) long, and its shoreline measures 6,280 meters (20,600 ft). It has a volume of 2,325,000 cubic meters (82,100,000 cu ft).

== Names ==
The lake was attested in historical sources as за Бобровскимъ (za Bobrovskim) in 1558, озерко Лидовское (ozerko Lidovskoe) in 1585–1587, Озеро Лядво (Ozero Lyadvo) c. 1790, Оз. Бобровское (Oz. Bobrovskoe) and Оз. Лидовское (Oz. Lidovskoe) c. 1866, and Боброво оз. (Bobrovo oz.) and Лудовское озеро (Ludovskoe oz.) c. 1882.

The modern name Pabra järv 'Lake Pabra' may be derived from the Russian word бобр, бобер (bobr, bober) 'beaver' or Latgalian babrs 'beaver'; the village of Bobrovo (Estonian: Pabra) was named after the lake. Bobrovo was formerly in Estonia's Petseri County; most of the area was transferred by the Soviet authorities from the Estonian SSR to Russia's Pskov Oblast in 1945. The name Kossa järv 'Lake Kossa' refers to the village of Kossa northwest of the lake, and the name Lidva järv 'Lake Lidva' refers to the Lidva (or Liidva) River, which flows from the lake at Bobrovo.

== See also ==
- List of lakes of Estonia
