= Ostrova =

Ostrova may refer to:

- Ostrova, Russia, a village in Vladimir Oblast
- Ostrova, Estonia, a village Võru County
- Lia Ostrova, Soviet and Russian artist
- Maria Ostrova, a fictional character from Madam Secretary
- Charitable Foundation Ostrova, a Russian cystic fibrosis charity

== See also ==
- Ostrov (disambiguation)
- Ostrava
