= Kitse =

Kitse may refer to:

- Kitse, former village in Estonia, now part of Pikajärve
- Kitsõ, village in Estonia (before 1997 Kitse)

== See also ==
- Kitseküla
