= Napi =

Napi may refer to:

- Näpi, an alevik (borough) in Estonia
- Napi, Hiiu County, a village in Hiiu Parish, Hiiu County, Estonia
- Napi, Võru County, a village in Setomaa Parish, Võru County, Estonia
- Napi Headquarters, New Mexico, a census-designated place (CDP) in San Juan County, New Mexico, United States
- Napi Gazdaság (meaning Daily Business in English), a daily newspaper published in Hungary
- Napioa, an important figure in Blackfoot mythology
- New API, an interface to use interrupt mitigation techniques for networking devices in the Linux kernel
