= Pabra =

Pabra may refer to:

- Lake Pabra, in Estonia
- Pabra, Hisar, a village in Haryana, India
