= Vinski =

Village in Estonia

- Location within Estonia
- Coordinates: 57°45′0″N 27°30′0″E
- Country: Estonia
- County: Võru County
- Time zone: UTC+2 (EET)

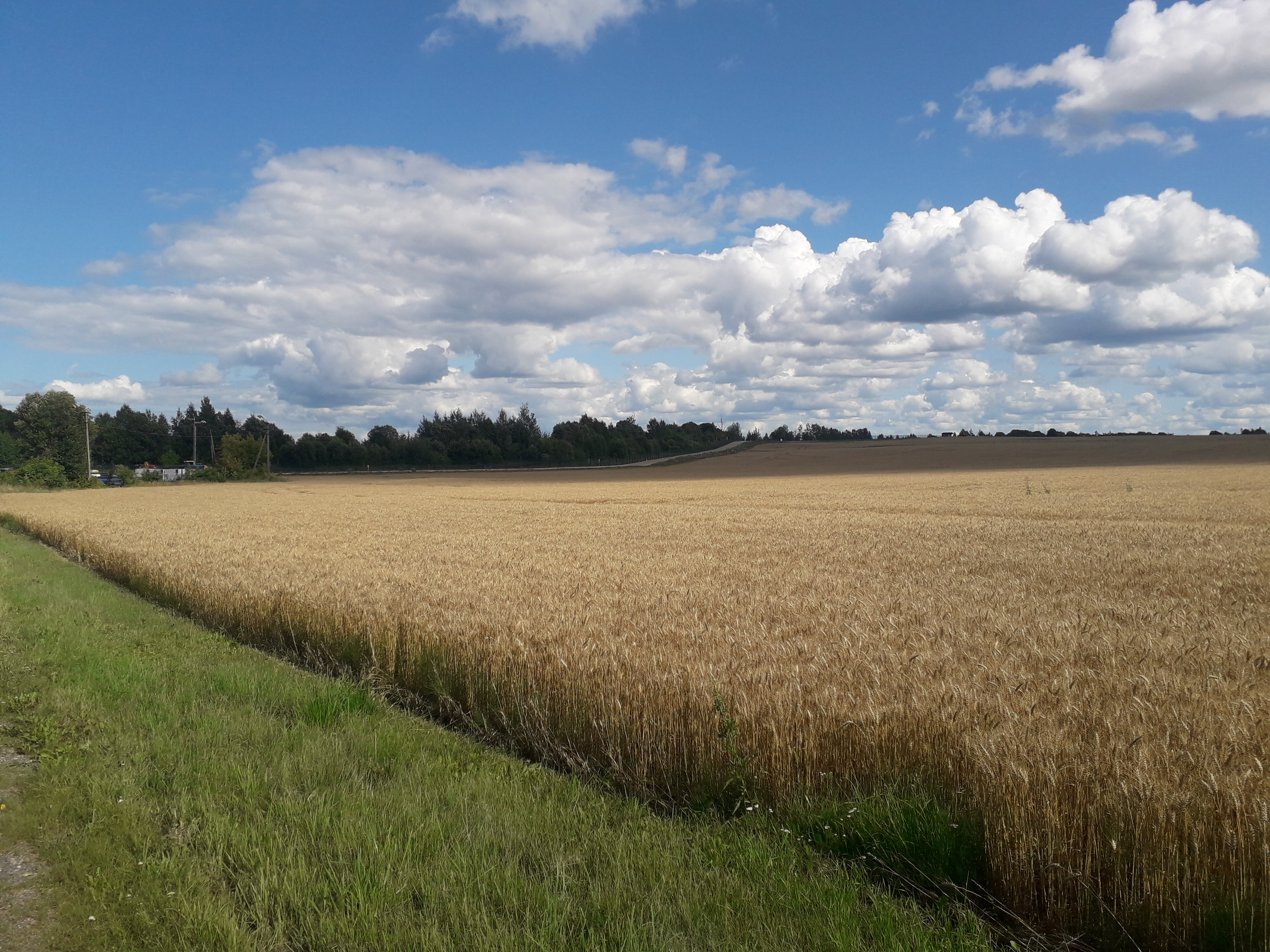
Setomaa parish, Vinski, not far from the Russian border

Vinski is a village in Setomaa Parish, Võru County in southeastern Estonia.

== History ==
During the Russian invasion of Ukraine from 2022 onwards, the border with Russia was permanently closed in nearby Vinski.
