= Tsirgu =

Village in Estonia

- Location within Estonia
- Coordinates: 57°45′35″N 27°25′12″E
- Country: Estonia
- County: Võru County
- Time zone: UTC+2 (EET)

Tsirgu is a settlement in Setomaa Parish, Võru County in southeastern Estonia.

== Tsirgu pine ==
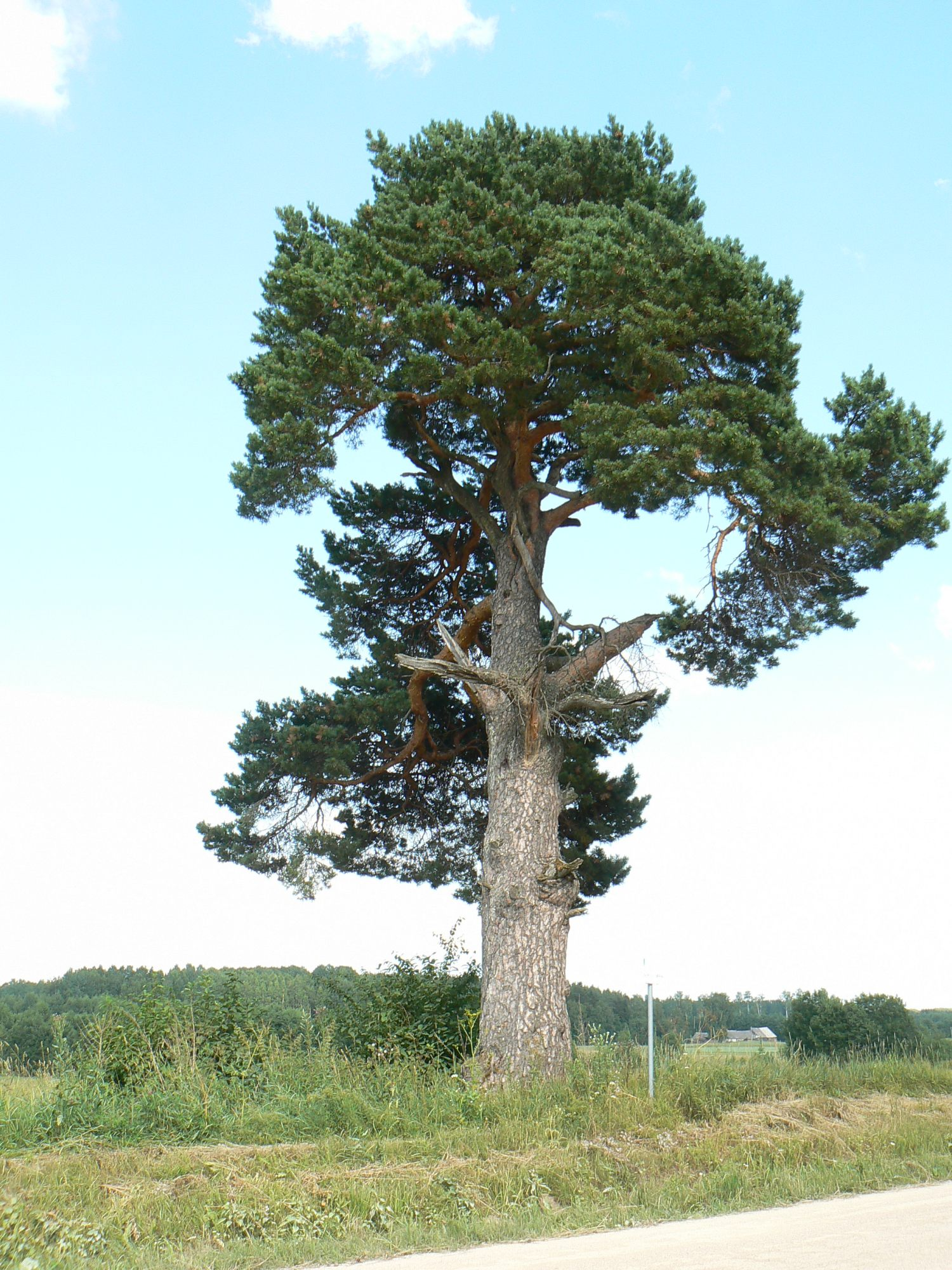
Tsirgu pine (2011)

The Tsirgu pine (Estonian: Kalmõpettäi) is a protected pine in Tsirgu village. It is about 12 metres (39 ft) tall and under protection as an archaeological monument.
