= Korela, Estonia =

Village in Estonia

Coordinates: 57°53′N 27°43′E

Korela
- Village
- Interactive map of Korela
- Country: Estonia
- County: Võru County
- Parish: Setomaa Parish
- Time zone: UTC+2 (EET)
  - Summer (DST): UTC+3 (EEST)

Korela is a village in Setomaa Parish, Võru County in southeastern Estonia. Prior to the 2017 administrative reform of local governments, it was located in Värska Parish.

The Metsatee Mustoja Forest Reserve is located in the eastern part of Korela, where Lake Poogandi is also located. South of the village borders the Piusa river.

== Gallery ==
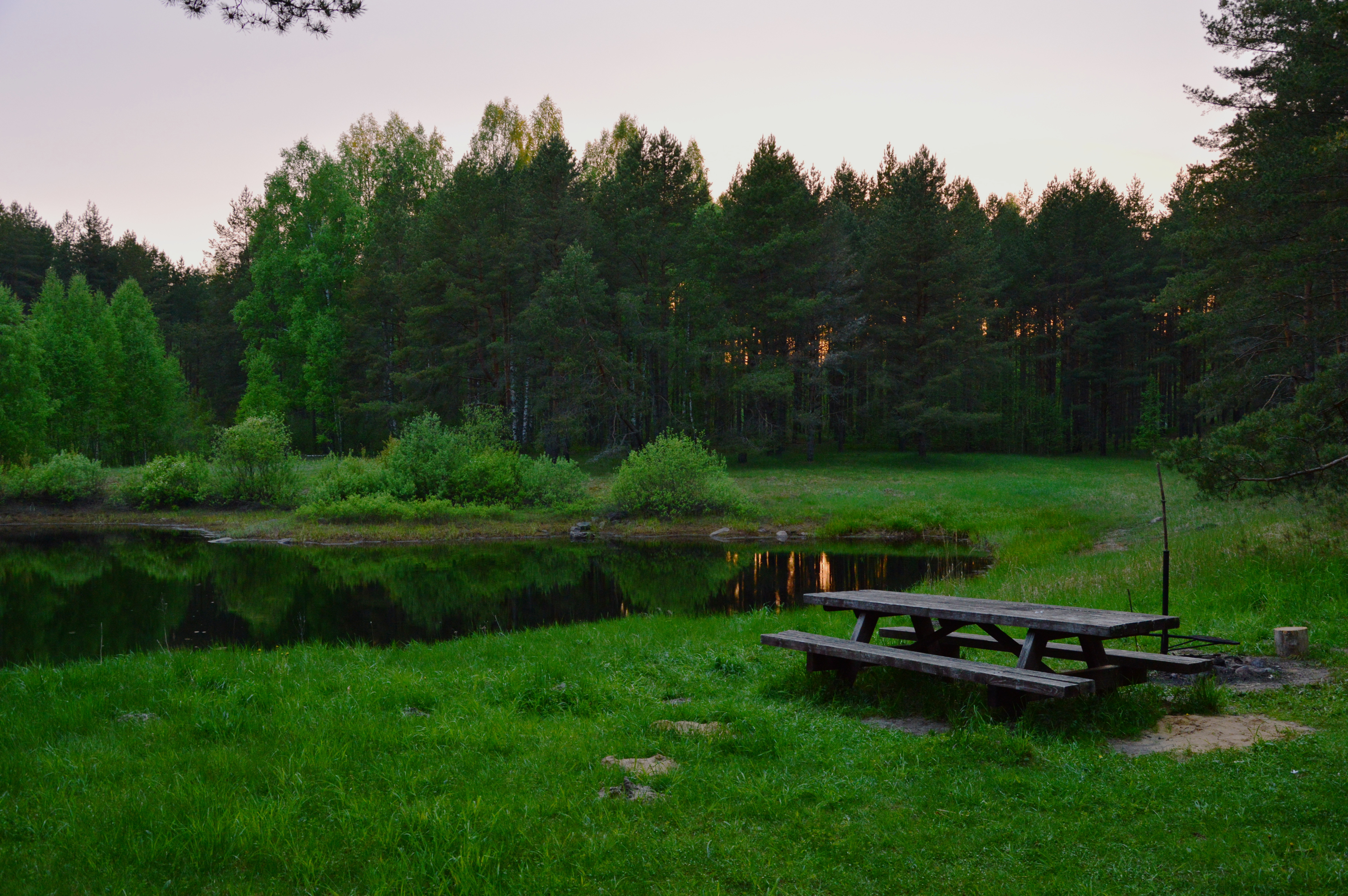
The Poogandi River Vacation Area

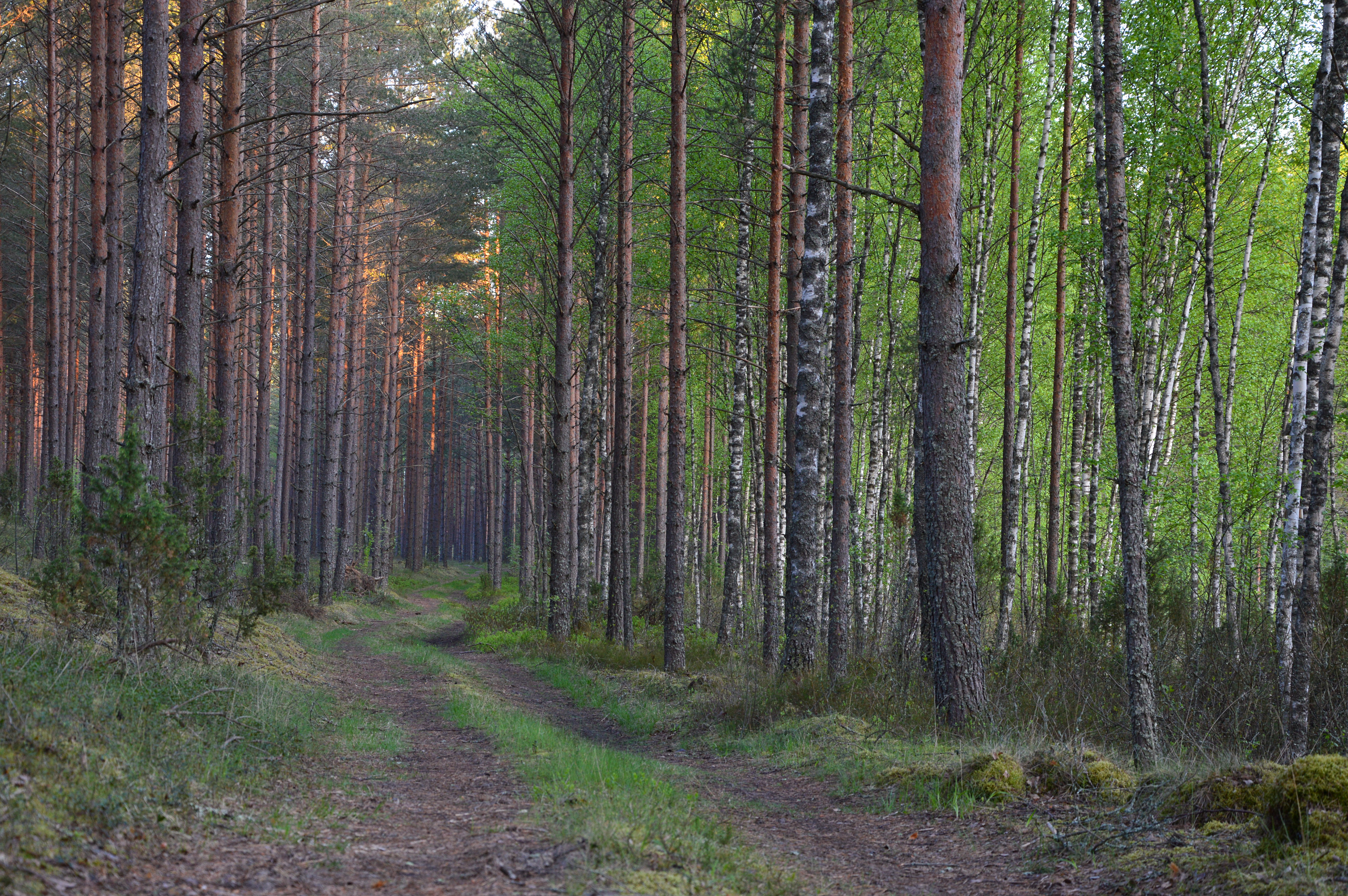
The Metsatee Mustoja Forest Reserve

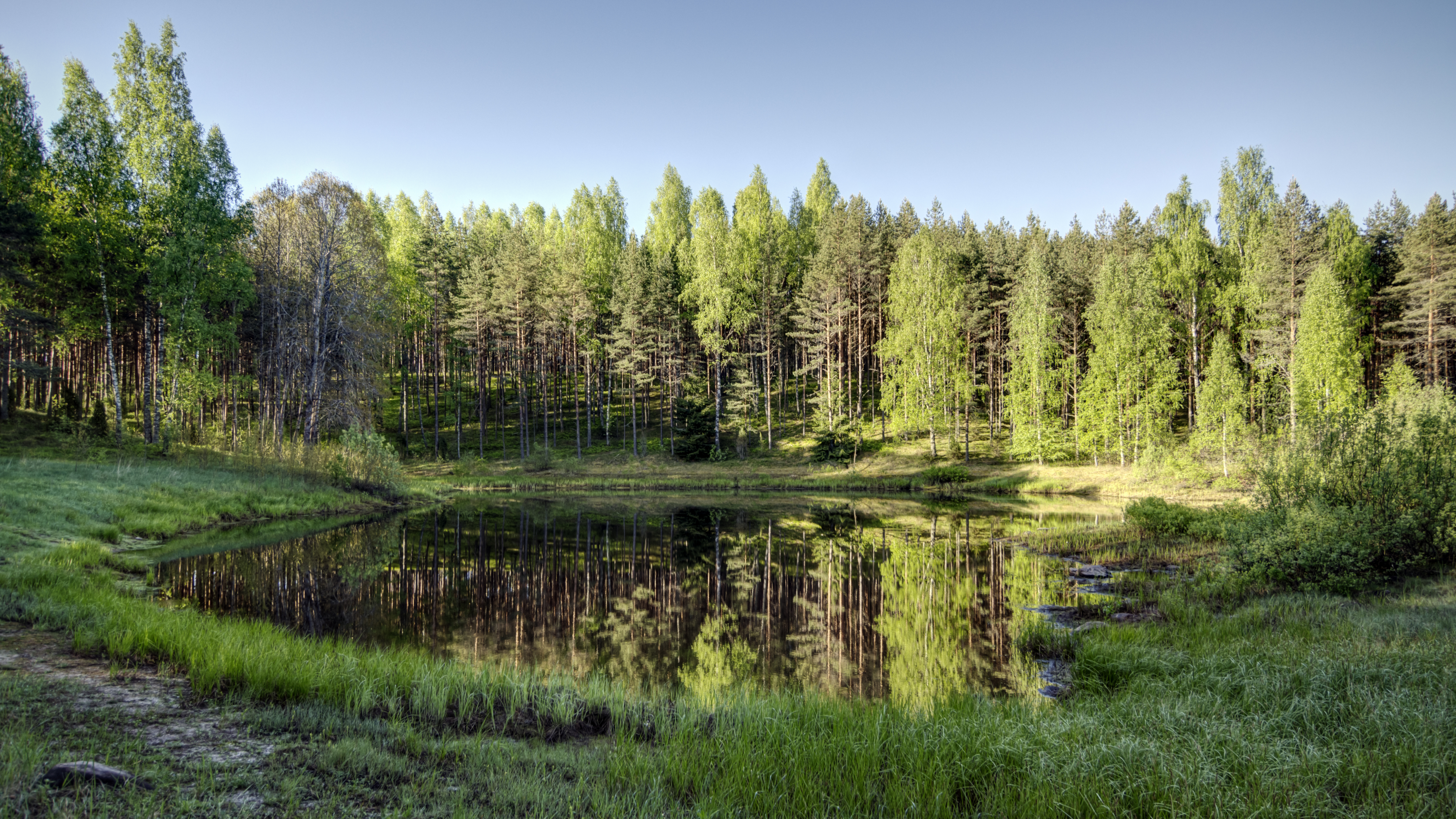
Poogandi Lake
