= Georg Pelisaar =

Estonian politician

Georg Pelisaar (born 7 December 1958 in Selise) is an Estonian journalist and politician. He was a member of the IX, X and XI Riigikogu.

He has been a member of Estonian Centre Party since 1991. On 11 May 2011, he was elected mayor of Põlva. Since 2013, he has been the mayor of Põlva Parish.
