= Antkruva =

Village in Estonia

- Village
- Location within Estonia
- Coordinates: 57.816944444444°N 27.385555555556°E
- Country: Estonia
- County: Võru County
- Parish: Setomaa Parish
- Time zone: UTC+2 (EET)
  - Summer (DST): UTC+3 (EEST)

Antkruva is a village in Setomaa Parish, Võru County in Estonia.

== Name ==
Antkruva was attested in written sources as Андрейково (Andreykovo) in 1585, Андроново (Andronovo) in 1652, Андрикова (Andrikova) c. 1790, Андрюково (Andryukovo) in 1872, Andrikova in 1904, Andrikovo c. 1920, Adrikova, Adrikovo, and Andrükova in 1922, and Antkruva in 1997. The name of the village is probably derived from the Seto first name Andri 'Andrew'.
