= Seretsüvä =

Village in Estonia

- Village
- Location within Estonia
- Coordinates: 57.8075°N 27.485°E
- Country: Estonia
- County: Võru County
- Parish: Setomaa Parish
- Time zone: UTC+2 (EET)
  - Summer (DST): UTC+3 (EEST)

Seretsüvä is a village in Setomaa Parish, Võru County in Estonia.

== Name ==
Seretsüvä was attested in written sources as Жеребцово (Zherebtsovo) in 1585–1587, Жеребцова (Zherebtsova) in 1866, Seretsova in 1875, Tseretsova in 1904, Sereptsevo in 1922, Serebtsova in 1923, Seretsuva in 1937, and Seretsyvä in 1997. The name of the village may be derived from the Russian word жеребец (zherebets) 'stallion' or жеребёнок (zherebyonok) 'foal'.
