= Põrstõ =

Village in Võru County, Estonia

- Village
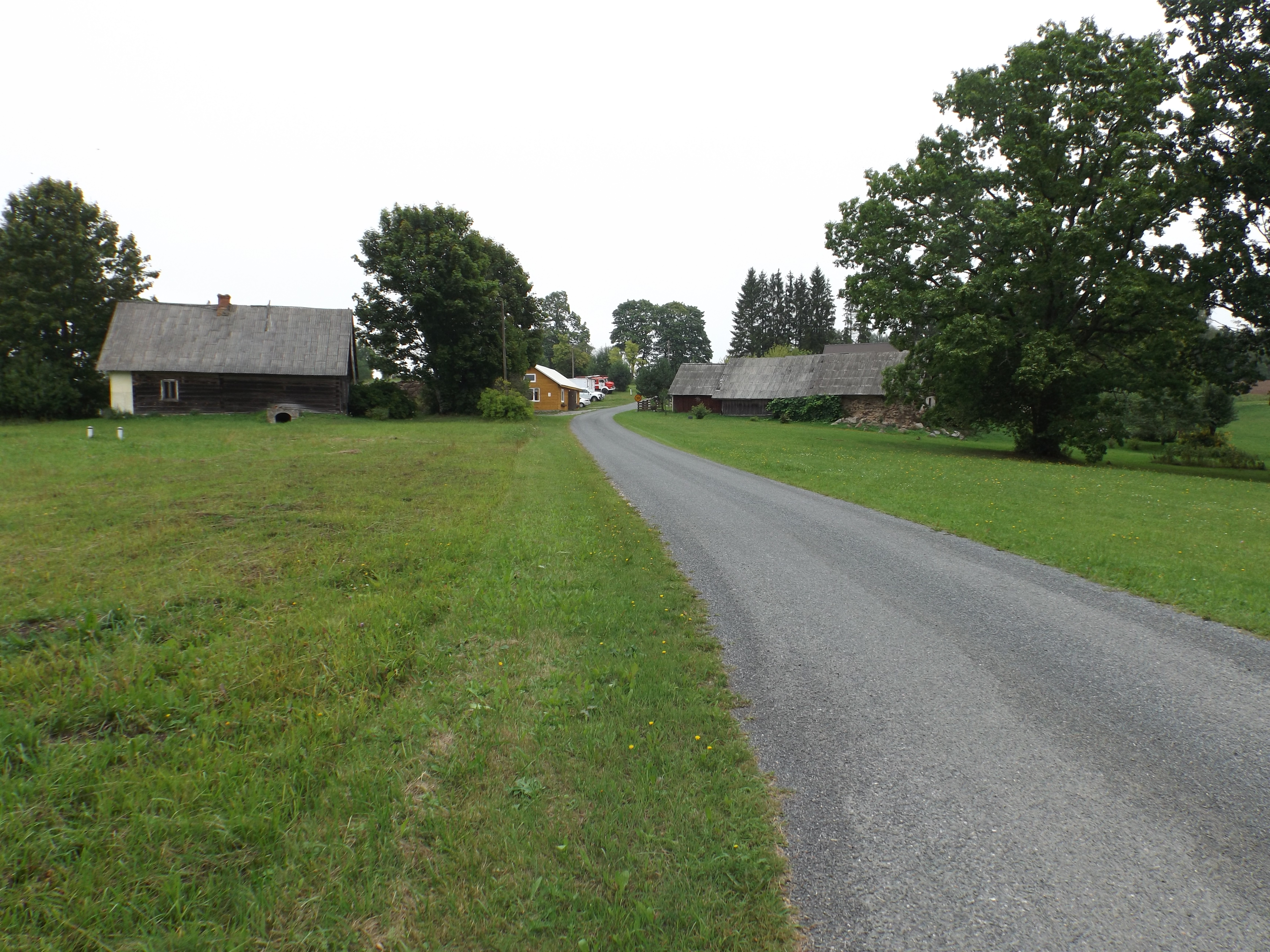

- Location within Estonia
- Coordinates: 57.6519°N 27.3375°E
- Country: Estonia
- County: Võru County
- Parish: Setomaa Parish
- Time zone: UTC+2 (EET)
  - Summer (DST): UTC+3 (EEST)

Põrstõ is a village in Setomaa Parish, Võru County in Estonia.
