= Laossina =

Village in Estonia

Coordinates: 58°02′N 27°35′E

- Village
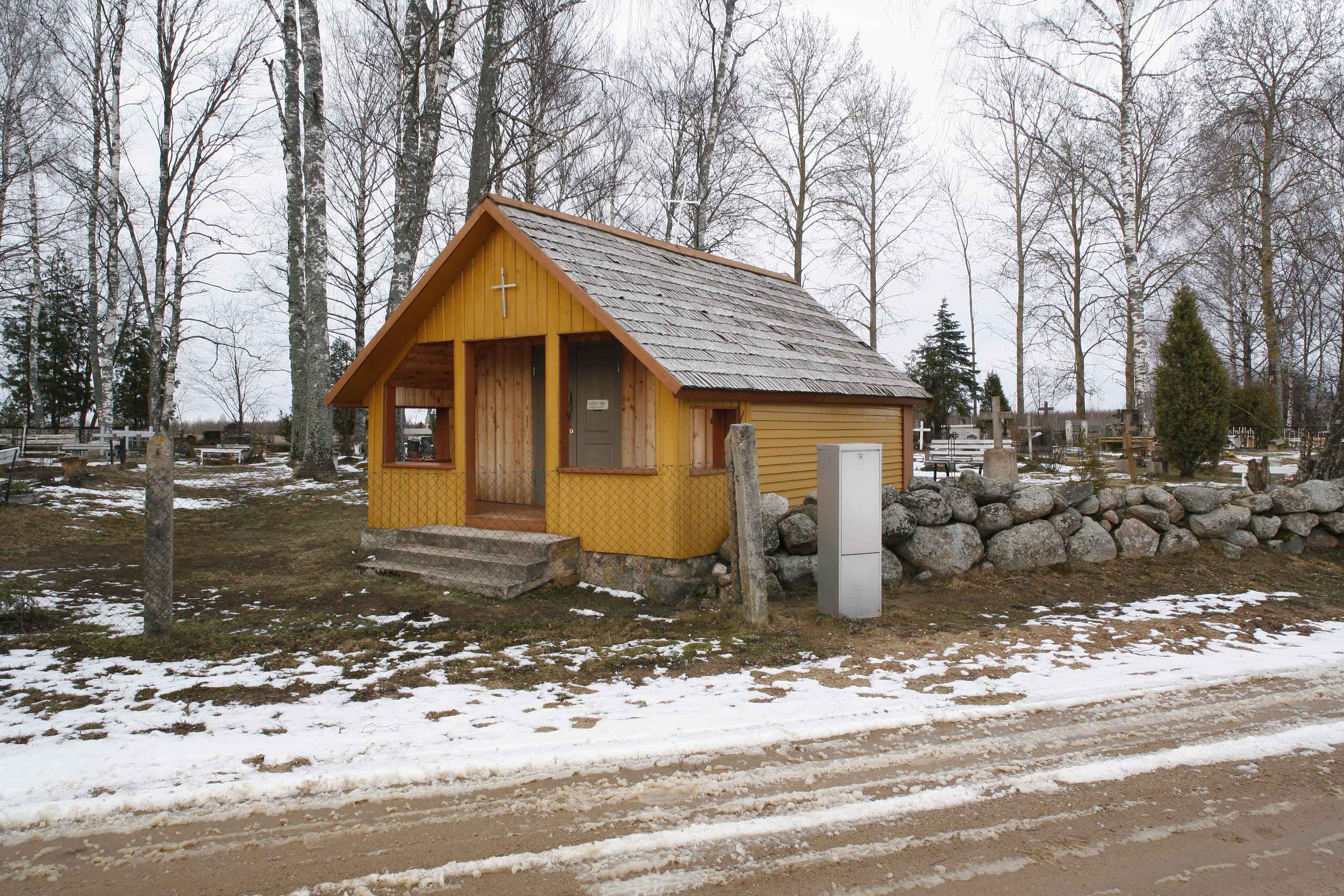
- Chapel in Laossina
- Interactive map of Laossina
- Country: Estonia
- County: Võru County
- Parish: Setomaa Parish
- Time zone: UTC+2 (EET)
  - Summer (DST): UTC+3 (EEST)

Laossina is a village in Setomaa Parish, Võru County in southeastern Estonia.
