= Kuksina =

Village in Estonia

- Location within Estonia
- Coordinates: 57°43′43″N 27°23′53″E
- Country: Estonia
- County: Võru County
- Time zone: UTC+2 (EET)

Kuksina is a settlement in Setomaa Parish, Võru County in southeastern Estonia.
