= Kiiova =

Village in Estonia

- Village
- Location within Estonia
- Coordinates: 57.824722222222°N 27.4925°E
- Country: Estonia
- County: Võru County
- Municipality: Setomaa Parish

Area
  - Total: 1.3 km^{2} (0.50 sq mi)

Population (2011)
  - Total: 1
  - Density: 0.77/km^{2} (2.0/sq mi)
- Time zone: UTC+2 (EET)
  - Summer (DST): UTC+3 (EEST)

Kiiova is a village in Setomaa Parish, Võru County, Estonia.
