= Setomaa Parish =

Municipality of Estonia

Coordinates: 57°58′00″N 27°37′00″E

Setomaa Parish Setomaa vald
- Municipality of Estonia
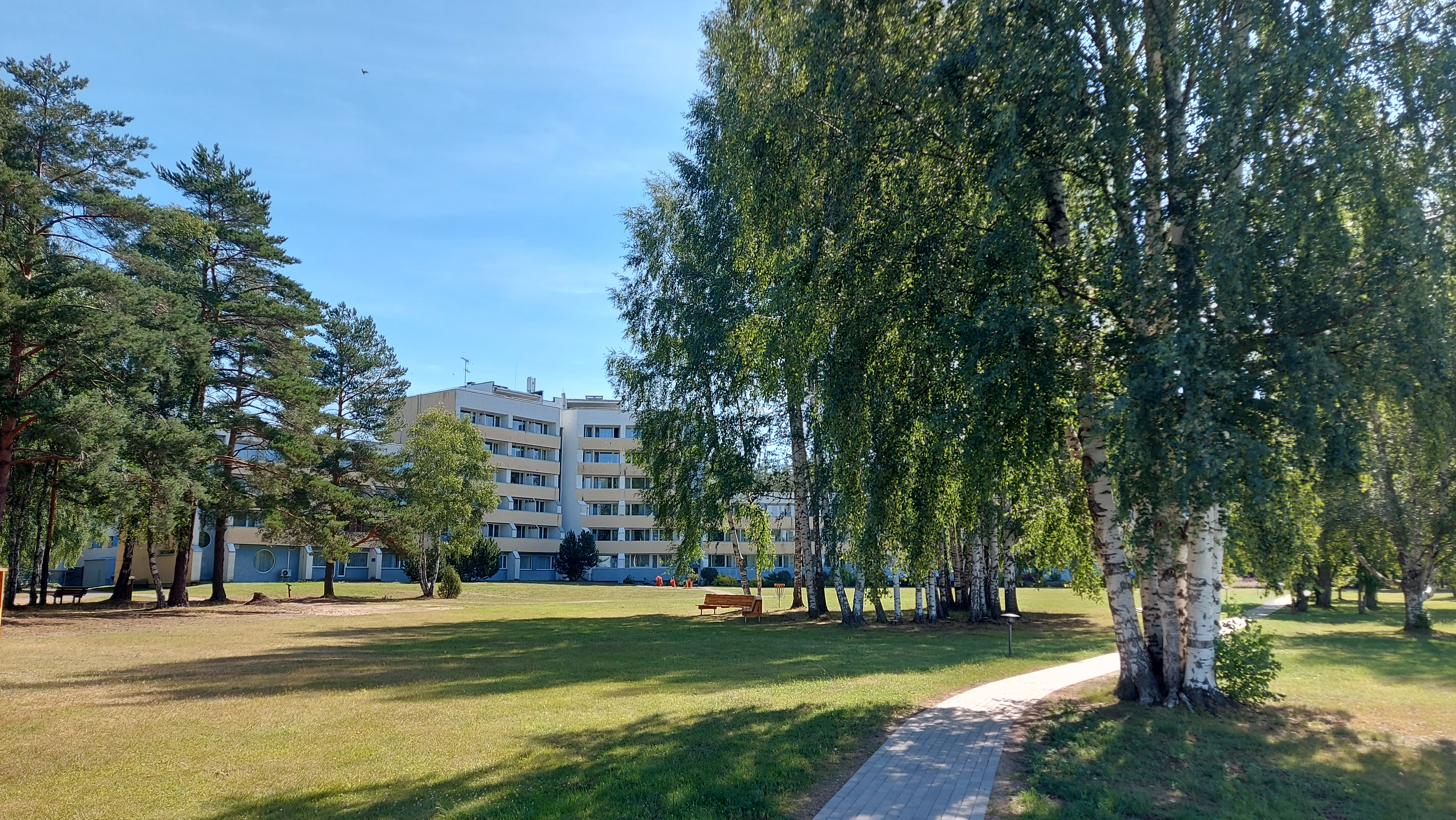
- Sanatorium in Värska

- Flag Coat of arms

- Setomaa Parish within Võru County.
- Country: Estonia
- County: Võru County

Area
  - Total: 463.18 km^{2} (178.83 sq mi)

Population (2026 )
  - Total: 3,003
  - Density: 6.483/km^{2} (16.79/sq mi)
- ISO 3166 code: EE-732

Setomaa Parish (Estonian: Setomaa vald) is a rural municipality of Estonia, in Võru County. Setomaa Parish was formed in 2017 during the administrative reform by merging Mikitamäe, Meremäe and Värska parishes and some parts of Misso parish.

== Demographics ==
The area has experienced a significant decline in population in recent decades, although in the past the region has been one of the most densely populated areas in Estonia.

Population in the municipality:

- 2000: 4,206
- 2011: 2,990
- 2022: 2,849

== Settlements ==
There is one small borough (alevik) Värska and 156 villages (küla) in Setomaa Parish.

The villages are: Ala-Tsumba, Antkruva, Audjassaare, Beresje, Ermakova, Helbi, Hilana, Hilläkeste, Hindsa, Holdi, Härmä, Ignasõ, Igrise, Jaanimäe, Juusa, Jõksi, Järvepää, Kahkva, Kalatsova, Kangavitsa, Karamsina, Karisilla, Kasakova, Kastamara, Keerba, Kiiova, Kiislova, Kiksova, Kitsõ, Klistina, Koidula, Kolodavitsa, Kolossova, Koorla, Korela, Korski, Kossa, Kostkova, Kremessova, Kriiva, Kuigõ, Kuksina, Kundruse, Kusnetsova, Kõõru, Käre, Küllätüvä, Laossina, Leimani, Lepä, Lindsi, Litvina, Lobotka, Lutepää, Lutja, Lütä, Lüübnitsa, Maaslova, Marinova, Martsina, Masluva, Matsuri, Melso, Merekülä, Meremäe, Miikse, Mikitamäe, Miku, Mokra, Määsi, Määsovitsa, Napi, Navikõ, Nedsaja, Niitsiku, Obinitsa, Olehkova, Ostrova, Paklova, Palandõ, Palo, Paloveere, Pattina, Pelsi, Perdaku, Pliia, Podmotsa, Poksa, Polovina, Popovitsa, Pruntova, Puista, Puugnitsa, Põrstõ, Raotu, Rokina, Ruutsi, Rõsna, Rääptsova, Rääsolaane, Saabolda, Saagri, Saatse, Samarina, Selise, Seretsüvä, Serga, Sesniki, Sirgova, Sulbi, Säpina, Talka, Tedre, Tepia, Tessova, Teterüvä, Tiastõ, Tiilige, Tiirhanna, Tiklasõ, Tobrova, Tonja, Toodsi, Toomasmäe, Treiali, Treski, Triginä, Tserebi, Tsergondõ, Tsirgu, Tsumba, Tuplova, Tuulova, Tääglova, Ulaskova, Ulitina, Usinitsa, Uusvada, Vaaksaarõ, Vaartsi, Varesmäe, Vasla, Vedernika, Velna, Veretinä, Verhulitsa, Vinski, Viro, Voropi, Võmmorski, Võpolsova, Võõpsu, Väike-Rõsna, Väiko-Härmä, Väiko-Serga, Õrsava.

== Geography ==
The shape of Setomaa parish is narrow and elongated. The parish consists of the main territory and the Luhamaa exclave located a few kilometers away.

The nature of Setomaa parish is characterized by a hillier landscape in the south and a lowland located by Lake Peipus in the north. The forests are mostly dry and luminous pine forests. The Piusa River flows through the rural municipality.

There is no weather station with long-term observation data in the municipality, however, the Environmental Agency has compiled the climate data for the municipality based on estimates.

Climate data for Setomaa parish 1991–2020
Month	Jan	Feb	Mar	Apr	May	Jun	Jul	Aug	Sep	Oct	Nov	Dec	Year
Mean maximum °C (°F)	5.0 (41.0)	5.0 (41.0)	11.5 (52.7)	21.5 (70.7)	26.3 (79.3)	28.2 (82.8)	29.9 (85.8)	28.8 (83.8)	23.5 (74.3)	16.4 (61.5)	10.2 (50.4)	6.1 (43.0)	17.7 (63.9)
Daily mean °C (°F)	−4.2 (24.4)	−4.5 (23.9)	−0.5 (31.1)	6.0 (42.8)	11.7 (53.1)	15.7 (60.3)	18.2 (64.8)	16.7 (62.1)	11.8 (53.2)	6.1 (43.0)	1.3 (34.3)	−2.0 (28.4)	6.4 (43.5)
Mean minimum °C (°F)	−21.0 (−5.8)	−20.5 (−4.9)	−14.5 (5.9)	−5.8 (21.6)	−1.7 (28.9)	3.2 (37.8)	7.3 (45.1)	5.3 (41.5)	0.2 (32.4)	−5.2 (22.6)	−10.1 (13.8)	−14.9 (5.2)	−6.5 (20.3)
Average precipitation mm (inches)	47.1 (1.85)	37.6 (1.48)	35.3 (1.39)	35.5 (1.40)	52.7 (2.07)	83.3 (3.28)	71.3 (2.81)	79.2 (3.12)	55.5 (2.19)	65.8 (2.59)	52.7 (2.07)	47.5 (1.87)	663.5 (26.12)
Source 1: Keskkonnaagentuur.ee
Source 2: Keskkonnaagentuur.ee

There is a hydrometric weather station of the Environmental Agency in Korela.

== Religion ==
Religion in Setomaa Parish (2021)
1. Unaffiliated (53.8%)
2. Orthodox (37.8%)
3. Lutheran (6.40%)
4. Unknown (2.00%)
5. 0.00%
6. 0.00%

== Gallery ==
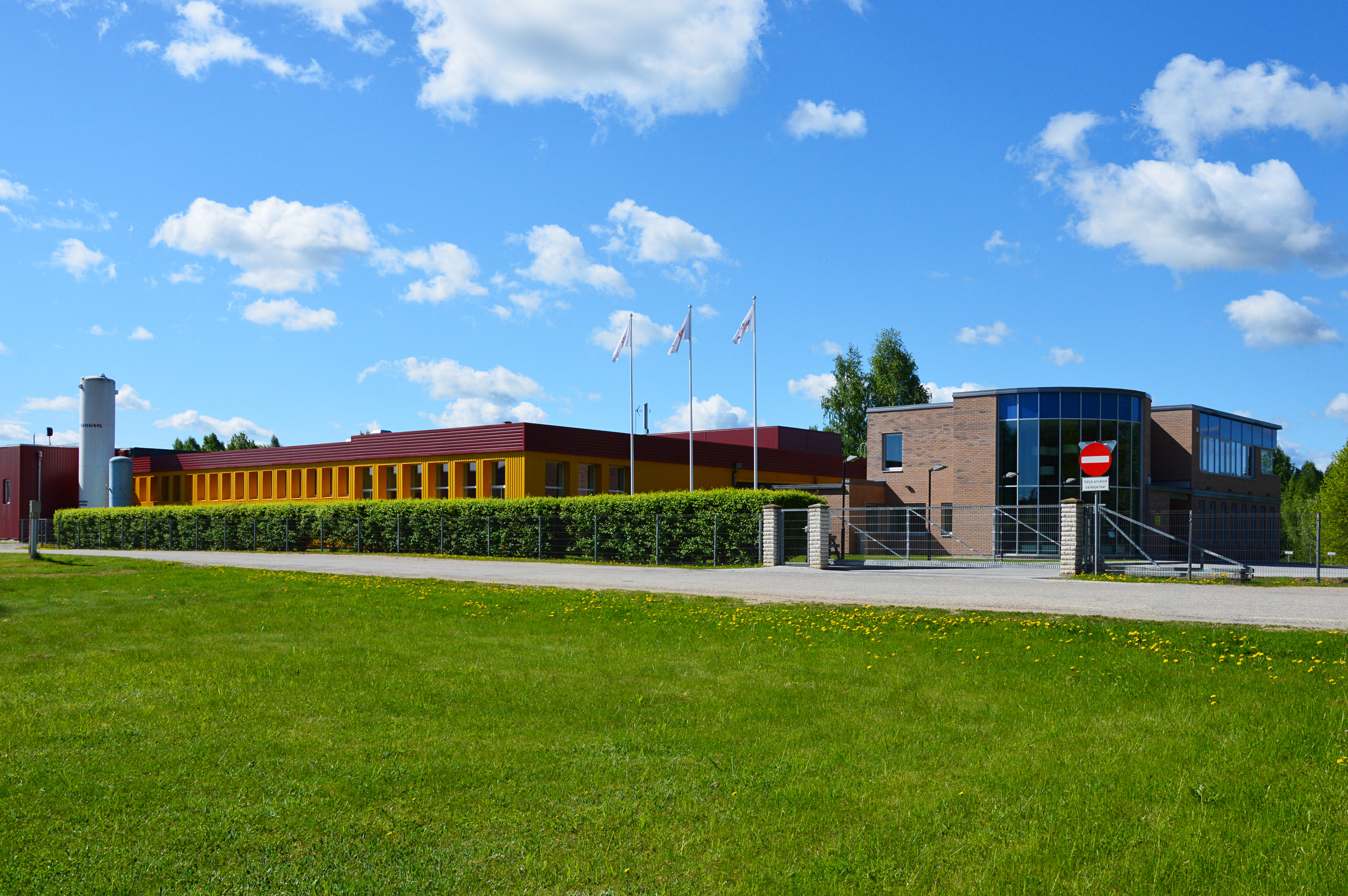
Mineral water production plant in the parish

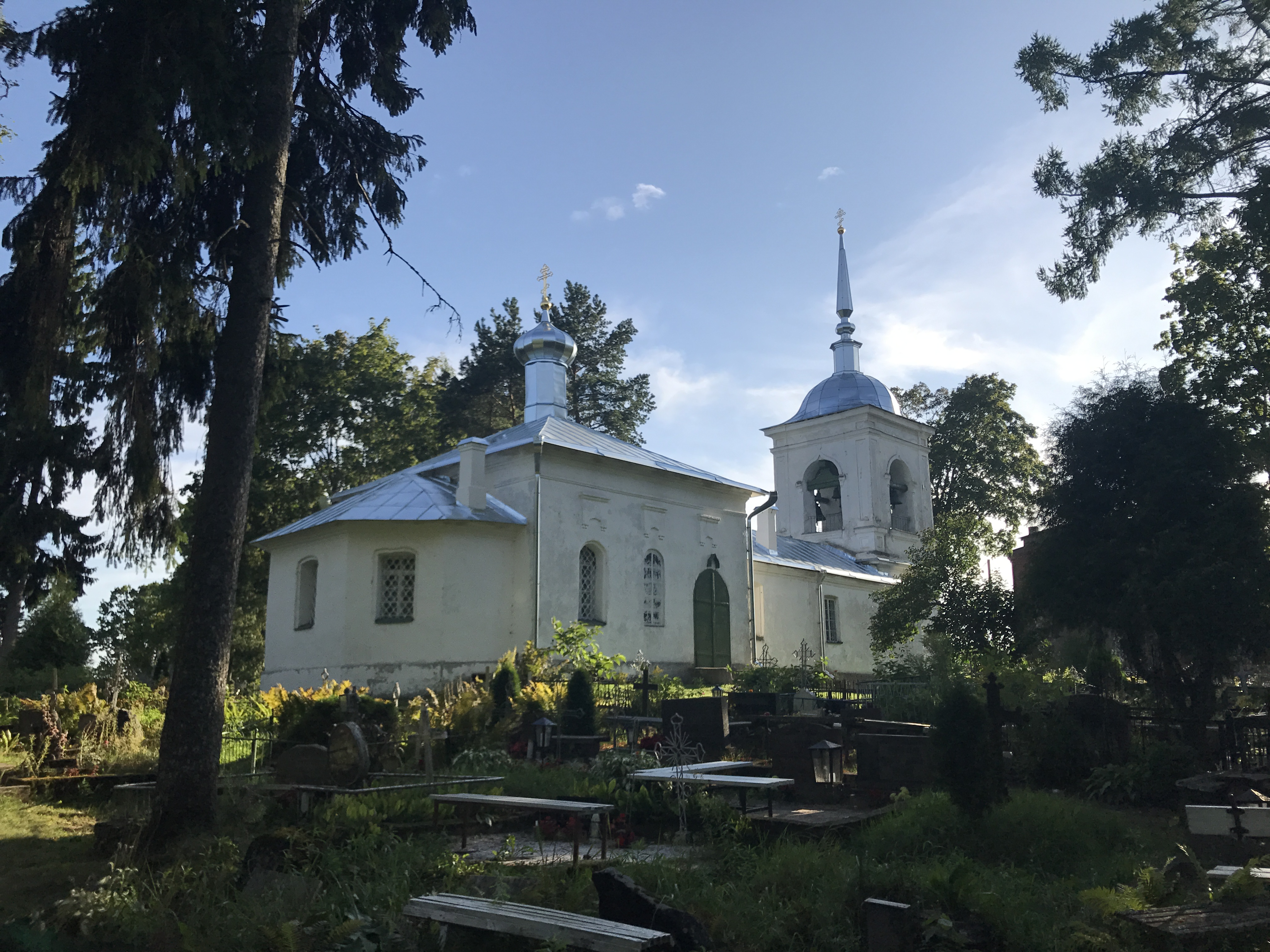
Church in Saatse

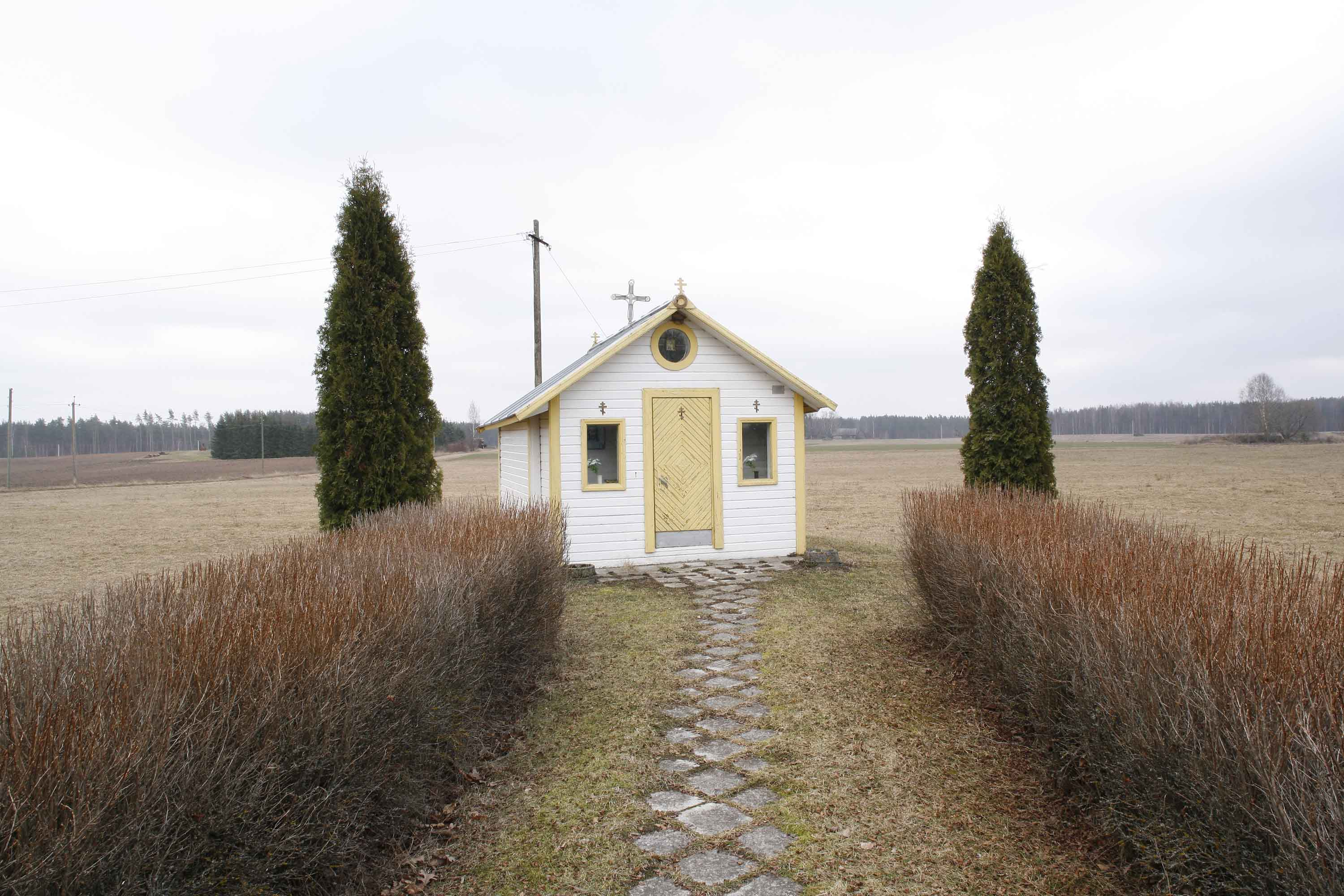
Small chapel in Treski

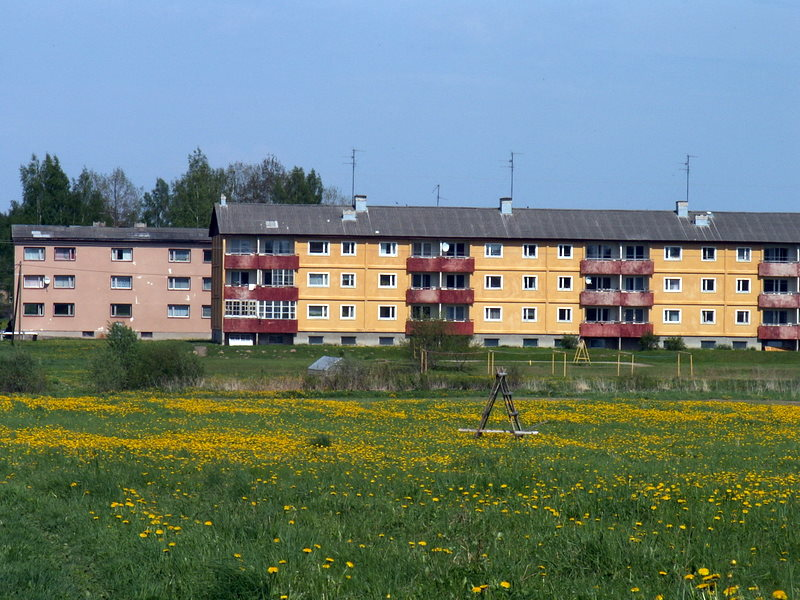
Mikitamäe

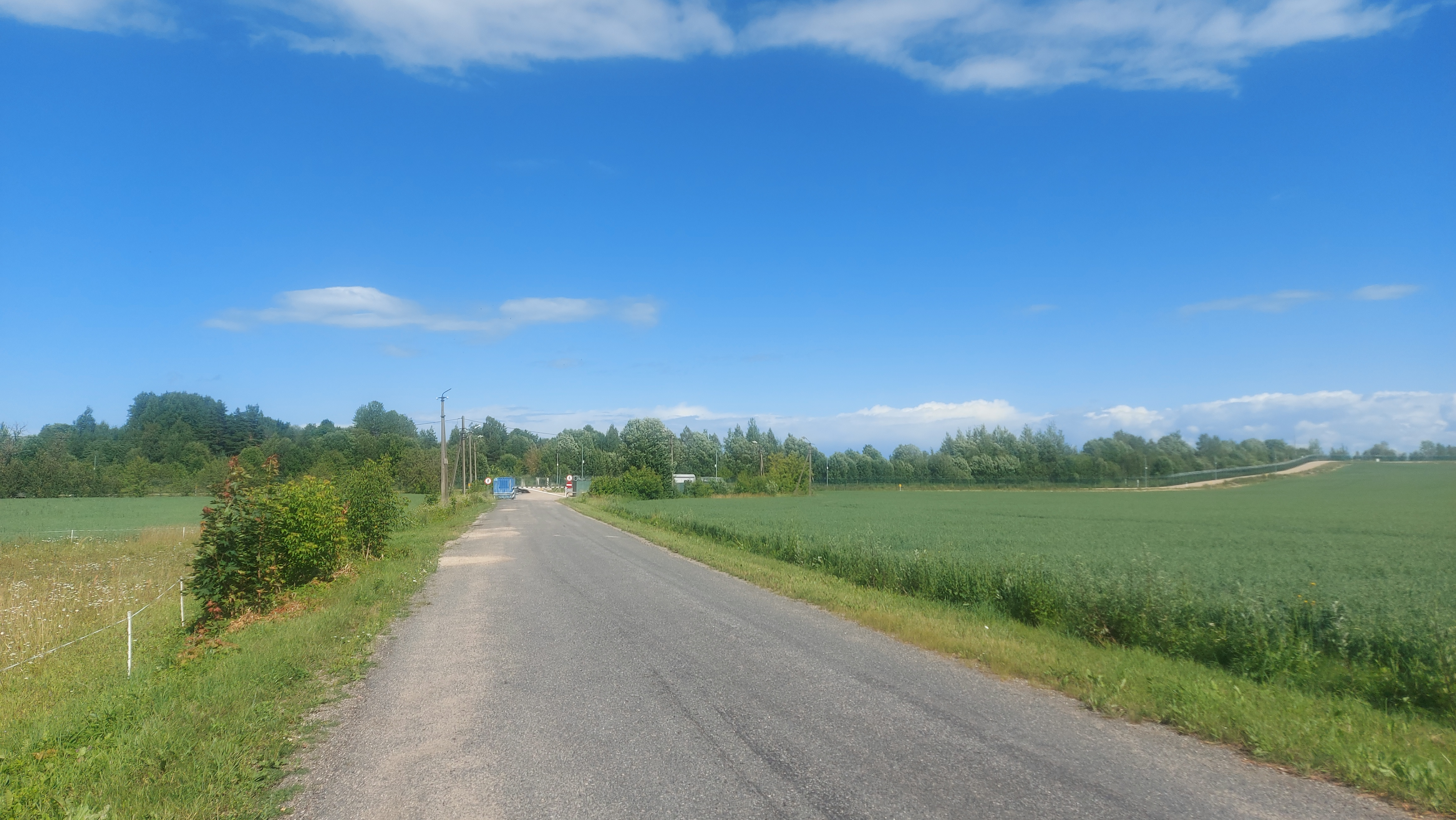
The Russian border seen from a distance in Vinski

== Notable people ==
- Anne Vabarna (1877 in Võpolsova – 1964), a Seto singer.
- Olli Ungvere (1906 in Lüütja – 1991), stage and film actress and singer for sixty years
- Silvi Liiva (1941 in Värska – 2023), printmaker and a freelance artist.
- Ülo Tulik (1957 in Meremäe – 2022), agronomist and politician and Mayor of Võru.
- Georg Pelisaar (born 1958 in Selise), journalist and politician, Mayor of Põlva and also of Põlva Parish
- Rein Järvelill (born 1966 in Uusvada), politician, formerly the municipal governor of Meremäe Parish
- Jaan Roose (born 1992 in Matsuri), a slackliner
