= Kiislova =

Village in Estonia

- Village
- Location in Estonia
- Coordinates: 57°43′18″N 27°25′50″E
- Country: Estonia
- County: Võru County
- Municipality: Setomaa Parish

Population (2011 Census)
  - Total: 6

Kiislova (also Kislova, Väike-Kiislova, Väike-Kislova, Urpuse, Ruusma, Kruusmäe) is a village in Setomaa Parish, Võru County in southeastern Estonia. It is located beside the Russian border, but there is not a border crossing. As of the 2011 census, the village's population was 6.
