= Juusa =

Village in Estonia

- Village
- Location within Estonia
- Coordinates: 57.820277777778°N 27.380277777778°E
- Country: Estonia
- County: Võru County
- Parish: Setomaa Parish
- Time zone: UTC+2 (EET)
  - Summer (DST): UTC+3 (EEST)

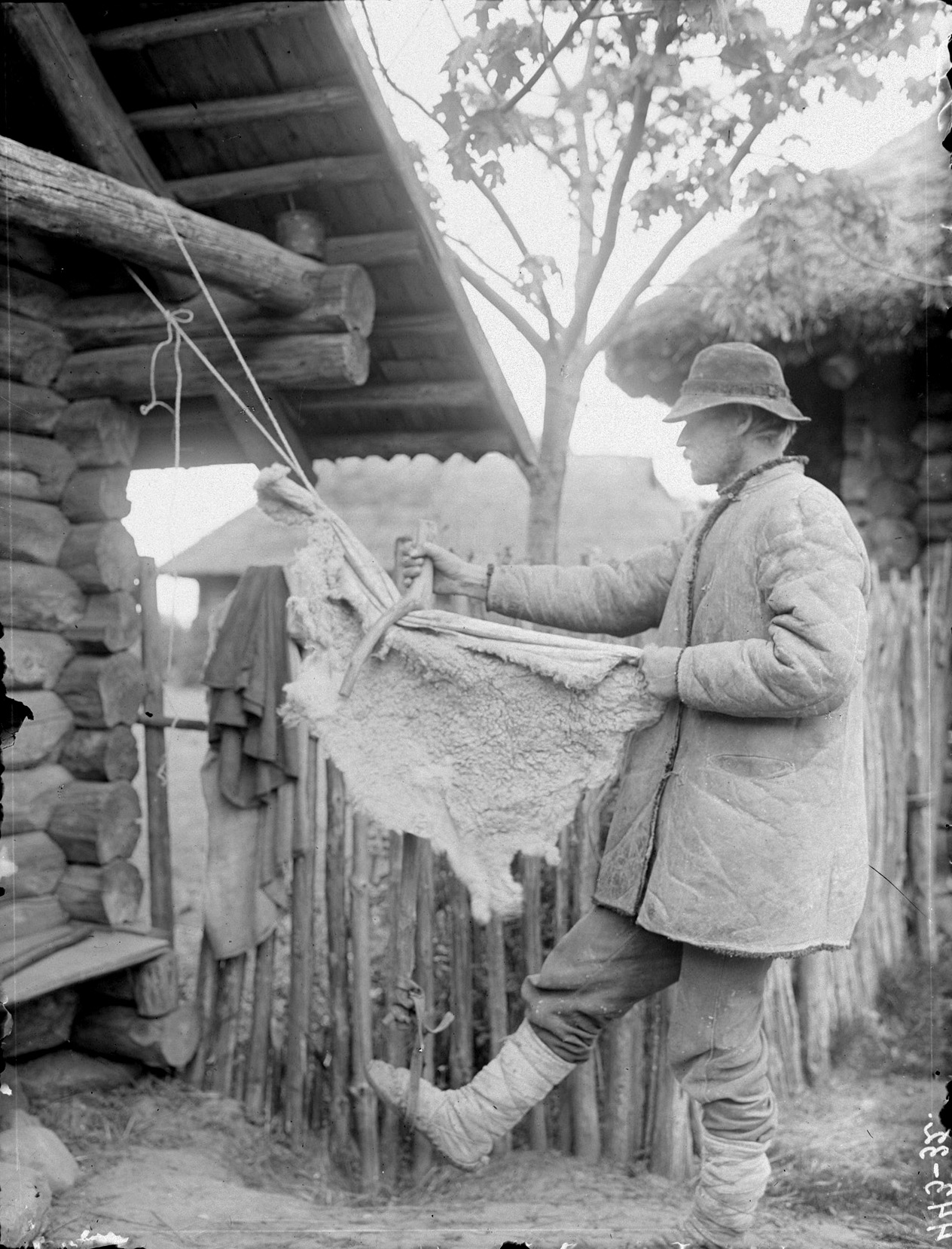
Sheepskin processing, Juuza village, Setomaa, 1920-1930s.

Juusa is a village in Setomaa Parish, Võru County in Estonia.
