= Kriiva =

Village in Estonia

- Location within Estonia
- Coordinates: 57°36′40″N 27°20′26″E
- Country: Estonia
- County: Võru County
- Municipality: Setomaa Parish

Area
  - Total: 8.1 km^{2} (3.1 sq mi)

Population (2020)
  - Total: 4
  - Density: 0.49/km^{2} (1.3/sq mi)
- Time zone: UTC+2 (EET)
  - Summer (DST): UTC+3 (EEST)

Kriiva is a settlement in Setomaa Parish, Võru County in southeastern Estonia.
