= Lütä =

Village in Estonia

- Village
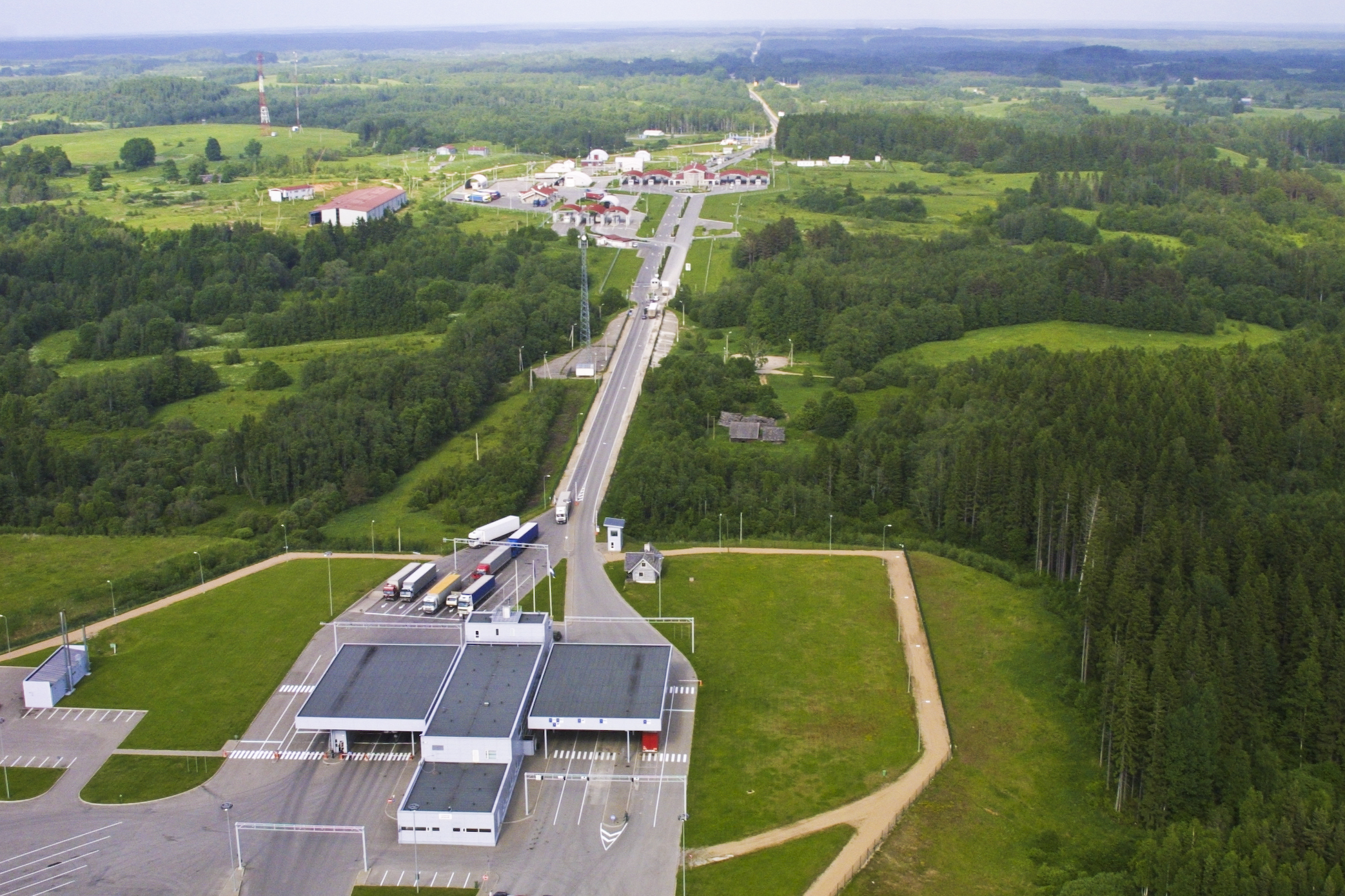
- Luhamaa border crossing.

- Location in Estonia
- Coordinates: 57°38′01″N 27°23′30″E
- Country: Estonia
- County: Võru County
- Municipality: Setomaa Parish

Area
  - Total: 3.7 km^{2} (1.4 sq mi)

Population (2011 Census)
  - Total: 5
  - Density: 1.4/km^{2} (3.5/sq mi)
- Time zone: UTC+2 (EET)
  - Summer (DST): UTC+3 (EEST)

Lütä is a village in Setomaa Parish, Võru County, in southeastern Estonia, by the Estonia–Russia border. The Luhamaa border crossing on the Estonian national road 7 (part of Riga–Pskov highway, E77) is located in Lütä village.

As of the 2011 census, the settlement's population was 5.
