= Keerba =

Village in Estonia

- Location within Estonia
- Coordinates: 57°44′24″N 27°27′59″E
- Country: Estonia
- County: Võru County
- Time zone: UTC+2 (EET)

Keerba is a settlement in Setomaa Parish, Võru County in southeastern Estonia.
