= Rõsna =

Village in Estonia

Coordinates: 58°00′N 27°37′E

- Village
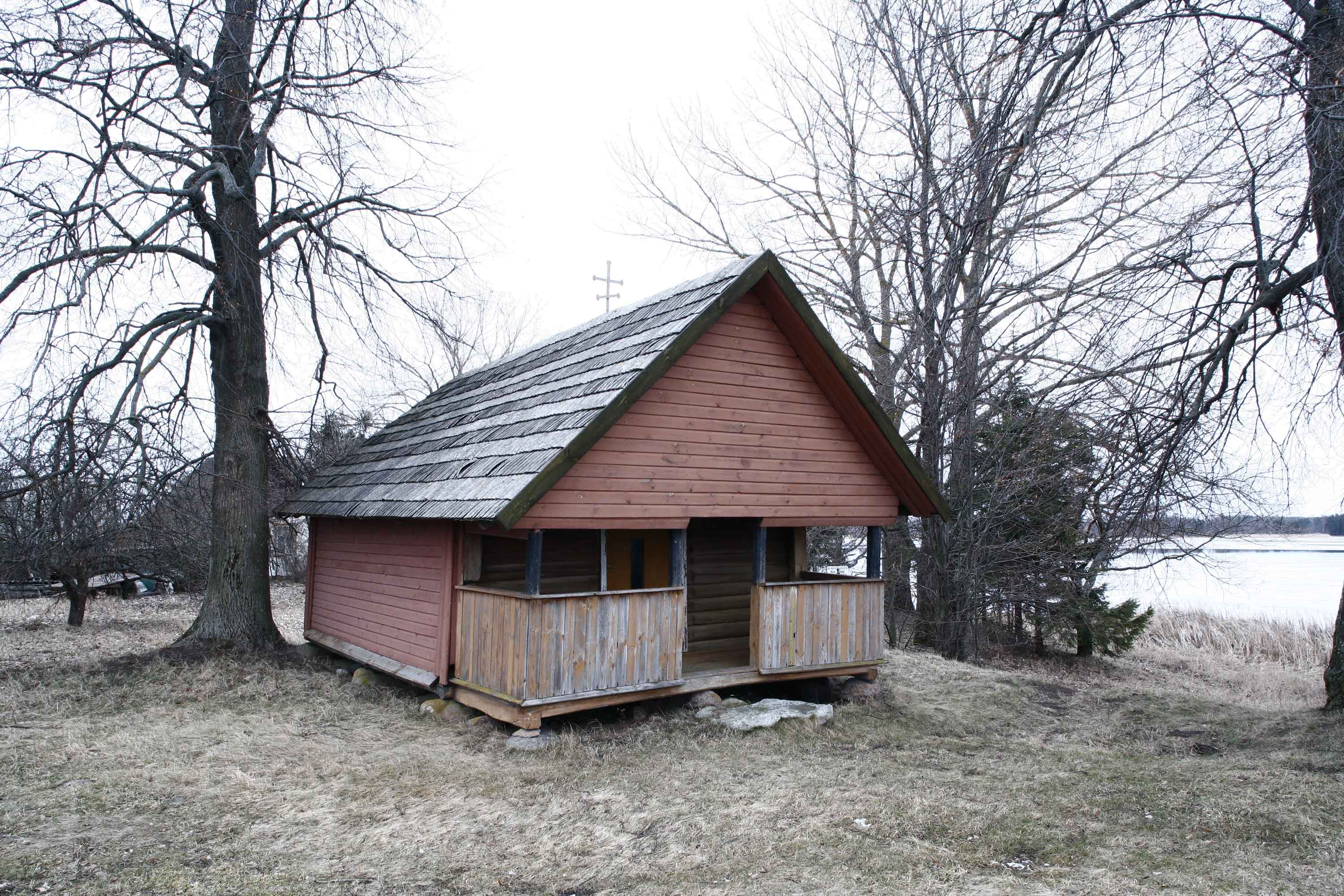
- Saint Anastasia's Chapel in Rõsna
- Interactive map of Rõsna
- Country: Estonia
- County: Võru County
- Parish: Setomaa Parish
- Time zone: UTC+2 (EET)
  - Summer (DST): UTC+3 (EEST)

Rõsna is a village in Setomaa Parish, Võru County in southeastern Estonia.
