= Hilana =

Village in Estonia

- Location within Estonia
- Coordinates: 57°49′42″N 27°23′44″E
- Country: Estonia
- County: Võru County

Population (2016)
  - Total: 6
- Time zone: UTC+2 (EET)

Hilana (until 1997, Hilande) is a settlement in Setomaa Parish, Võru County in southeastern Estonia.
