= Leimani =

Village in Estonia

- Village
- Location within Estonia
- Coordinates: 57.630277777778°N 27.316944444444°E
- Country: Estonia
- County: Võru County
- Parish: Setomaa Parish
- Time zone: UTC+2 (EET)
  - Summer (DST): UTC+3 (EEST)

Leimani is a village in Setomaa Parish, Võru County in Estonia.
