= Beresje =

Village in Estonia

Coordinates: 58°05′N 27°35′E

- Village
- Interactive map of Beresje
- Country: Estonia
- County: Võru County
- Parish: Setomaa Parish
- Time zone: UTC+2 (EET)
  - Summer (DST): UTC+3 (EEST)

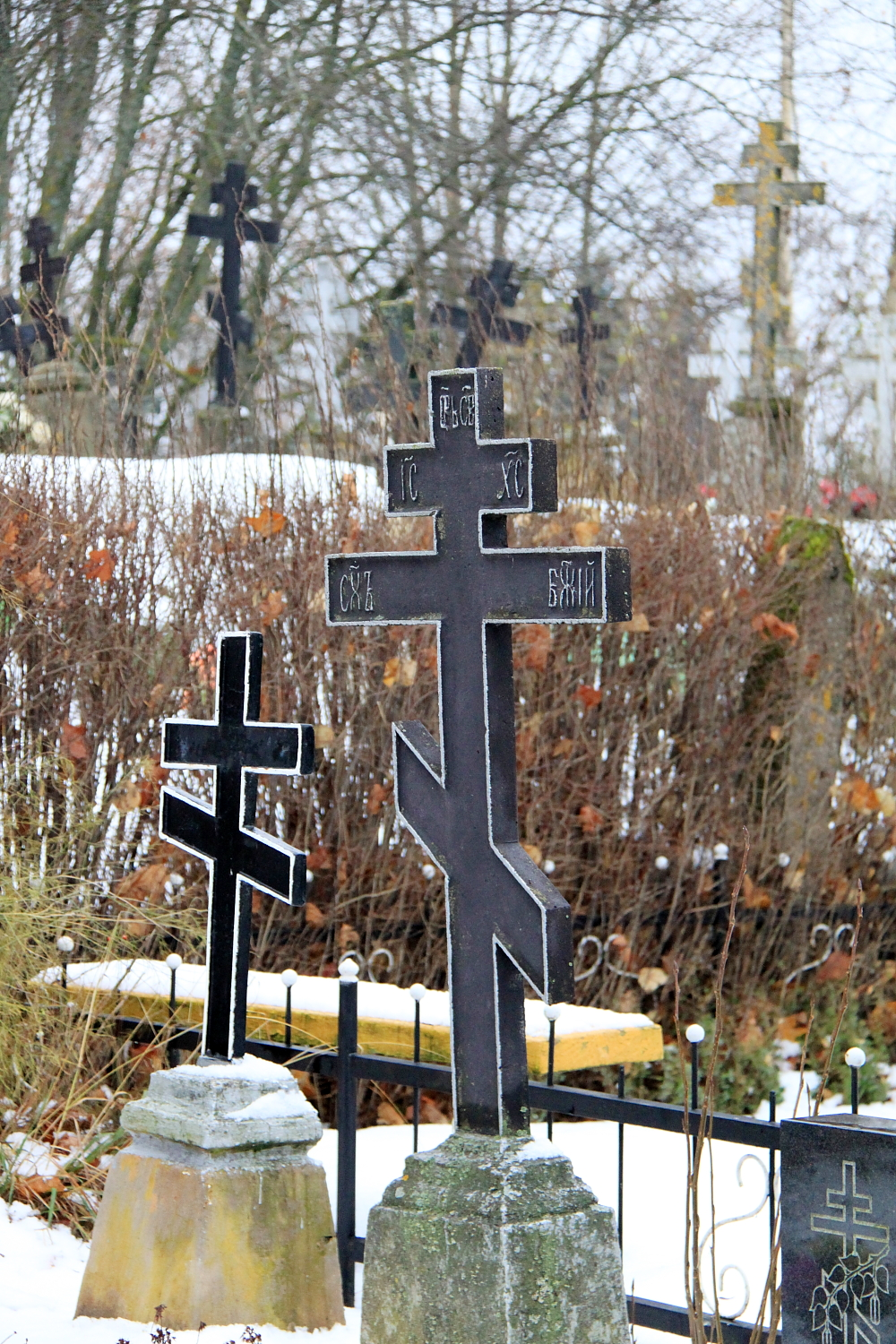
Beresje Orthodox graveyard

Beresje is a village in Setomaa Parish, Võru County in southeastern Estonia.

The village of Beresje represents a typical fishermen village, where all the houses are built in rows parallel to the shore of the Lake Pihkva. The village was first mentioned in 1582 and it belonged to Poloda area. The main activity was fishing (mainly sparling) and fish processing. The name is believed to be derived from the Russian word berjoza ('birch').

Beresje is the only village in Setomaa that is still inhabited by Old Believers (or starovers). At the end of the village there is a village cemetery, which also includes the burial site of the Old Believers. Beresje mere is a relic lake of Lake Peipus.

Before the administrative reform of Estonian local governments in 2017, the village belonged to Mikitamäe rural municipality and Põlva county.
