= Lobotka =

Village in Estonia

- Village
- Location within Estonia
- Coordinates: 57°57′43″N 27°36′56″E
- Country: Estonia
- County: Võru County
- Parish: Setomaa Parish
- Time zone: UTC+2 (EET)
  - Summer (DST): UTC+3 (EEST)

Lobotka is a village in Setomaa Parish, Võru County in southeastern Estonia.
