= Klistina =

Village in Estonia

- Village
- Location within Estonia
- Coordinates: 57.800555555556°N 27.448333333333°E
- Country: Estonia
- County: Võru County
- Parish: Setomaa Parish
- Time zone: UTC+2 (EET)
  - Summer (DST): UTC+3 (EEST)

Klistina is a village in Setomaa Parish, Võru County in Estonia.
