= Olli Ungvere =

Estonian actress and singer

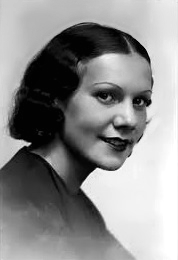
- Born: Olga Marie Birk; 17 June 1906; Lüütja, Kreis Werro, Governorate of Livonia
- Died: 12 December 1991 (aged 85); Pärnu, Estonia
- Other name: Olga Ungerson
- Occupations: Actress, singer
- Years active: 1928–1990

Olli Ungvere (born Olga Marie Birk; 17 June 1906 – 12 December 1991) was an Estonian stage and film actress and singer whose career spanned more than sixty years on the stages of most of Estonia's largest theaters.

== Early life ==
Born Olga Marie Birk in Lüütja, Mikitamäe Parish, in Setomaa, she was the youngest of two sisters born to Oskar Alfred Julius Birk and Leeno Nass (née Praggi). Her father was a factory worker in the village of Võõpsu. Her mother also had eight children from a previous marriage who were raised by Unvgere's parents.

She graduated from secondary school at Räpina Joint Gymnasium in 1924. From 1931 until 1934, she studied singing at the Heino Eller Tartu Music College in Tartu.

== Stage career ==
In 1931, while still a student at the Heino Eller Tartu Music College, she joined the Vanemuine theatre's operetta chorus. She made her stage debut in 1931 in the Oscar Straus operetta Marietta. From 1934 until 1936, she was engaged at the Ugala theatre in Viljandi as an operetta soloist and dramatic actress. From 1937 until 1948, she was engaged at the Estonian Drama Theatre in Tallinn. Her longest engagement was the Endla Theatre in Pärnu, where she worked as a performer from 1948 until 1986. Her career in theatre spanned nearly sixty years, making her one of Estonia's most prolific stage performers.

During her long stage career, she appeared in productions in works by: William Shakespeare, Richard Brinsley Sheridan, Marcel Pagnol, Erskine Caldwell, Maxim Gorky, Honoré de Balzac, Carlo Goldoni, Bertolt Brecht and Kurt Weill, Sergei Rachmaninoff, Edward Albee, among many others. She also appeared in many productions in works by Estonian playwrights and authors; most memorably in productions of works by Oskar Luts, Friedrich Reinhold Kreutzwald and Aarne Üksküla.

== Film ==
Olli Ungvere has also appeared in several films, including: the 1981 Raivo Trass directed drama Keskpäev, the 1983 Peeter Urbla directed crime drama Suletud ring, and the 1989 supernatural short Mardipäev, directed by Jaan Kolberg.

== Death and legacy ==
Olli Ungvere died in Pärnu in 1991 at age 85. She was buried in the Pärnu Forest Cemetery.

In 1946, she was awarded the Merited Artist of the Estonian SSR.
