= Pliia =

Village in Estonia

- Village
- Location within Estonia
- Coordinates: 57.7744°N 27.4903°E
- Country: Estonia
- County: Võru County
- Parish: Setomaa Parish

Area
  - Total: 0.7444 km^{2} (0.2874 sq mi)

Population (2021)
  - Total: 10
  - Density: 13.43/km^{2} (34.8/sq mi)
- Time zone: UTC+2 (EET)
  - Summer (DST): UTC+3 (EEST)

Pliia is a village in Setomaa Parish, Võru County in Estonia.

The village is divided into two regions, Meremäe and Võrumaa, both with the postal code 65329.

The Setomaa parish is home to multiple ethnic and linguistic minority living groups and are known to maintain close ties to traditional roots through their clothing customs, language and cuisine. In 2007, the European Destinations of Excellence (EDEN) was launched by the European Commission, in which Setomaa was a nominee in 2015 for Estonia's hidden treasures - Food tourism destination.

According to the Statistical Office of Estonia, the village has seen an annual population decrease of -2.6% since 2011 (total population 13), with there being 10 residents recorded during the 2021 census. This records nearly a 50% decrease in population from the 2000 census, which recorded the total population at 19.
