= Tiastõ =

Village in Estonia

Teaste
- Location within Estonia
- Coordinates: 57°38′53″N 27°19′15″E
- Country: Estonia
- County: Võru County
- Time zone: UTC+2 (EET)

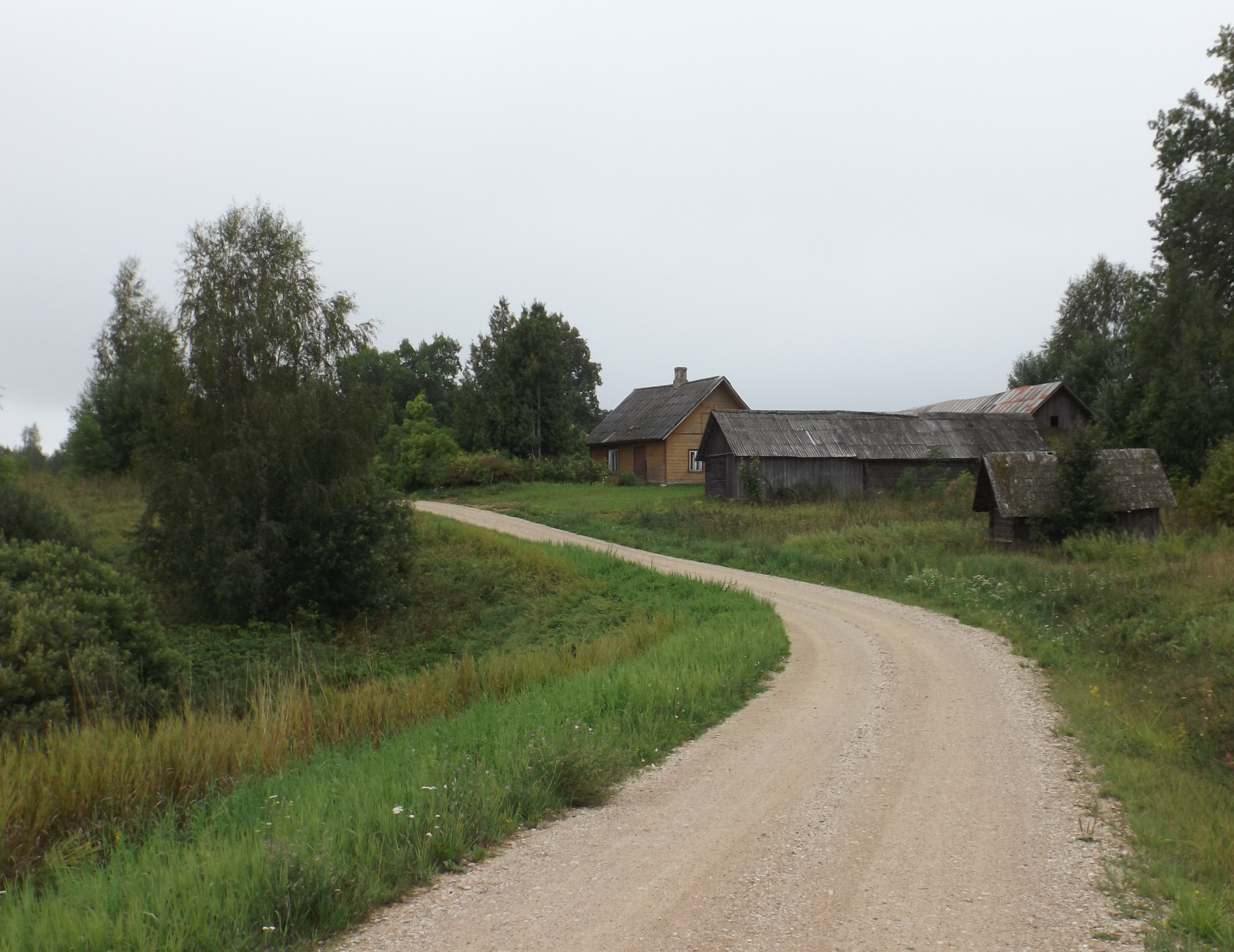
Farm in Tiastõ village near Tsässonalumbi, August 2023.

Teaste is a settlement in Setomaa Parish, Võru County in southeastern Estonia.
