= Puista =

Village in Estonia

- Village
- Location within Estonia
- Coordinates: 57.7489°N 27.3878°E
- Country: Estonia
- County: Võru County
- Parish: Setomaa Parish
- Time zone: UTC+2 (EET)
  - Summer (DST): UTC+3 (EEST)

Puista is a village in Setomaa Parish, Võru County, Estonia.
