= Mikitamäe =

Village in Estonia

Coordinates: 58°00′N 27°33′E

- Village
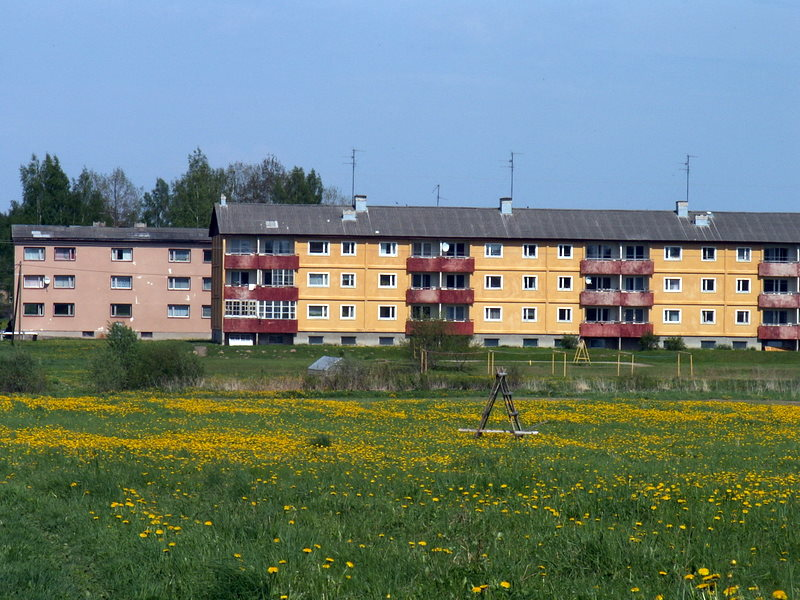
- Interactive map of Mikitamäe
- Country: Estonia
- County: Võru County
- Parish: Setomaa Parish
- Time zone: UTC+2 (EET)
  - Summer (DST): UTC+3 (EEST)

Mikitamäe (Seto: Mikitämäe, Mikidämäe) is a village in Setomaa Parish, Võru County in southeastern Estonia. As of 1st of January, 2020, it has 247 inhabitants. It is located in Setomaa, near Lake Peipus.
