= Ostrova, Russia =

Ostrova Острова
- Village
- Location within Vladimir Oblast Location within Russia
- Coordinates: 55°40′N 40°29′E
- Country: Russia
- Region: Vladimir Oblast
- District: Gus-Khrustalny District
- Time zone: UTC+3:00

Ostrova (Russian: Острова) is a rural locality (a village) in Posyolok Urshelsky, Gus-Khrustalny District, Vladimir Oblast, Russia. The population was 19 as of 2010.

== Geography ==
Ostrova is located 18 km northwest of Gus-Khrustalny (the district's administrative centre) by road. Novy is the nearest rural locality.
