= Lüübnitsa =

Village in Estonia

Coordinates: 58°03′N 27°36′E

- Village
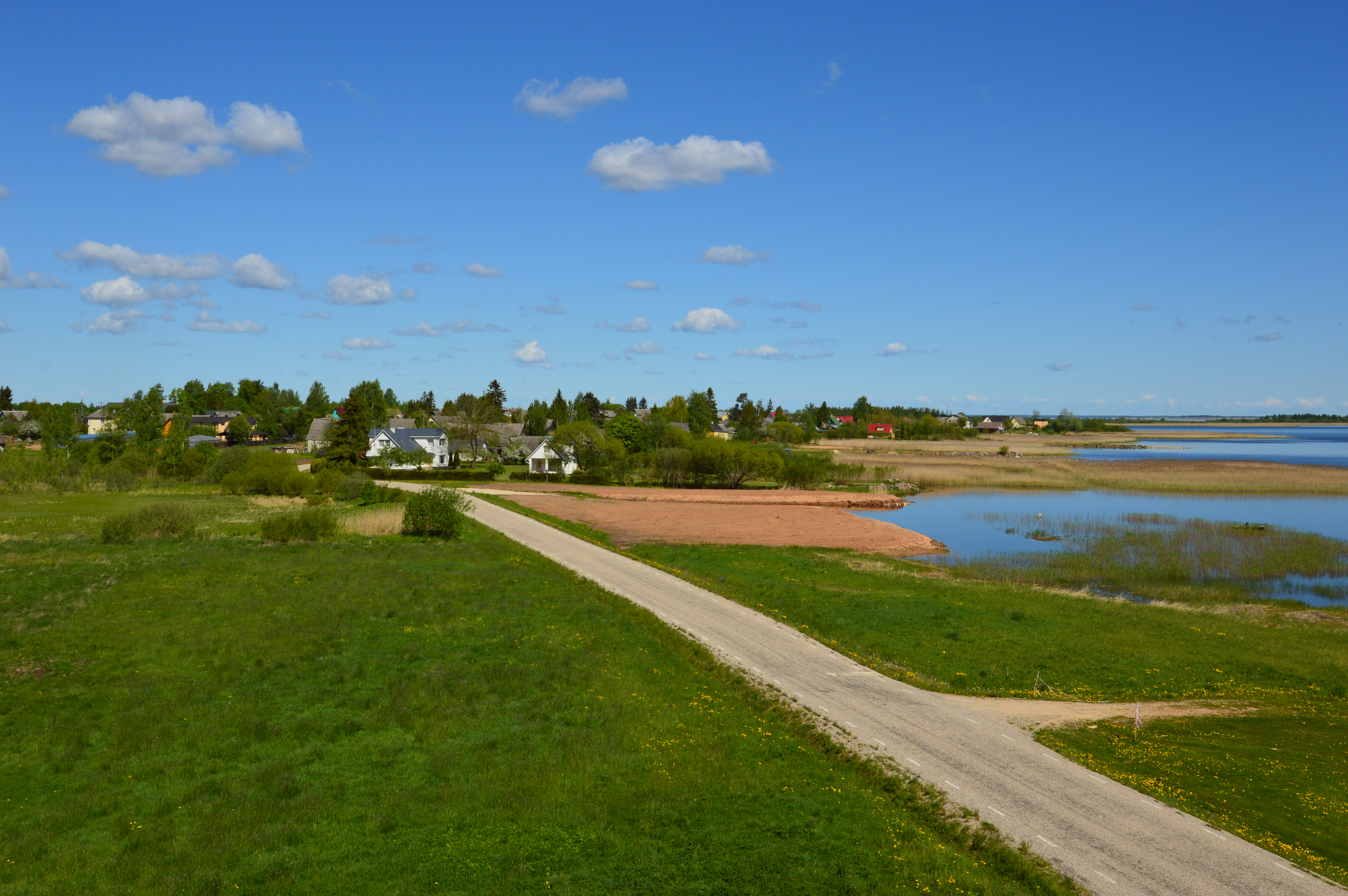
- Interactive map of Lüübnitsa
- Country: Estonia
- County: Võru County
- Parish: Setomaa Parish
- Time zone: UTC+2 (EET)
  - Summer (DST): UTC+3 (EEST)

Lüübnitsa is a village in Setomaa Parish, Võru County in southeastern Estonia.
