= Võõpsu, Võru County =

Village in Estonia

Coordinates: 58°04′35″N 27°32′38″E

Võõpsu
- Village
- Interactive map of Võõpsu
- Country: Estonia
- County: Võru County
- Parish: Setomaa Parish
- Time zone: UTC+2 (EET)
  - Summer (DST): UTC+3 (EEST)

Võõpsu is a village in Setomaa Parish, Võru County in southeastern Estonia.
