= Napi, Võru County =

Village in Estonia

- Village
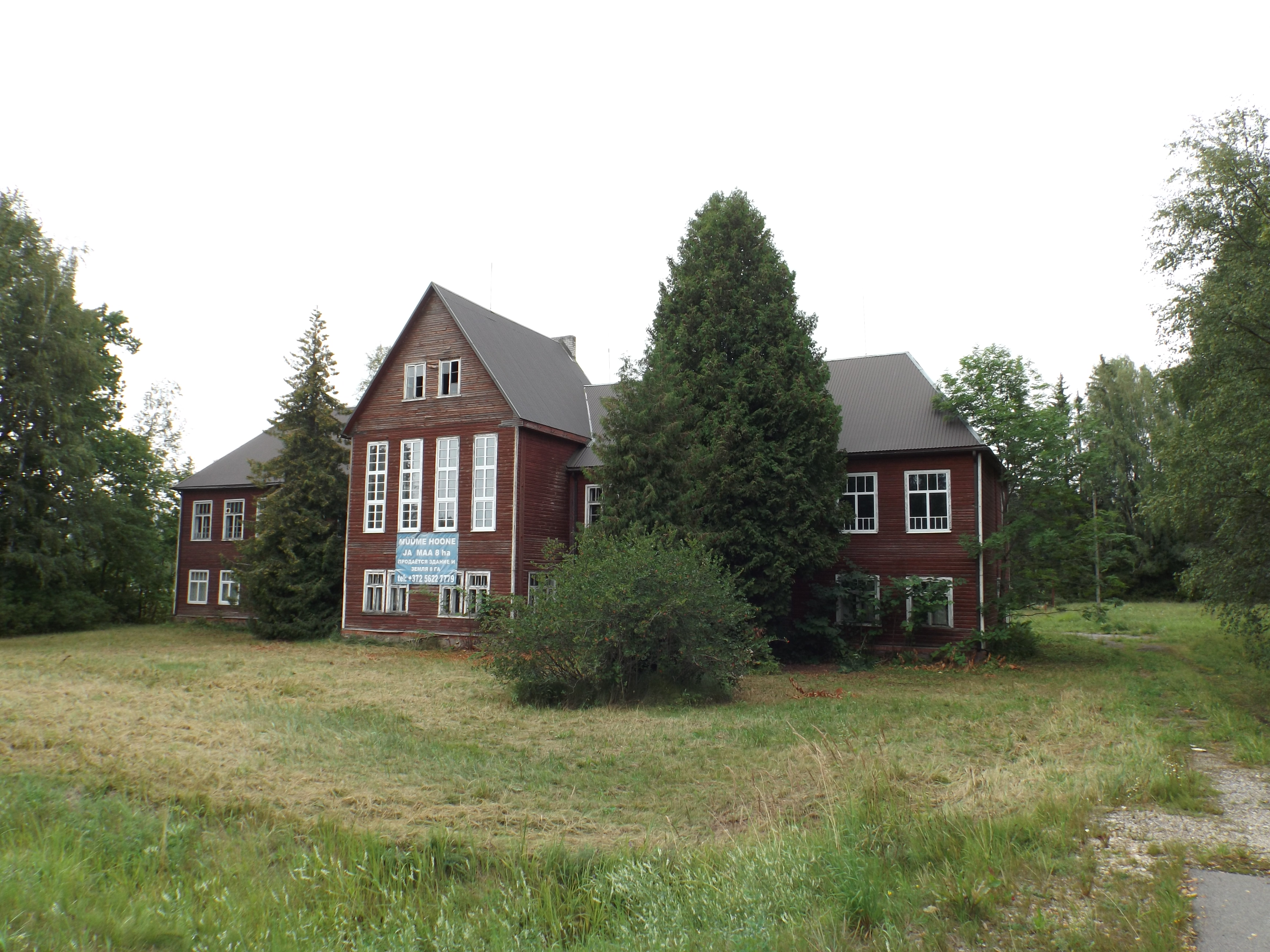
- Luhamaa Schoolhouse, Napi (2023)

- Location within Estonia
- Coordinates: 57.6375°N 27.3314°E
- Country: Estonia
- County: Võru County
- Parish: Setomaa Parish
- Time zone: UTC+2 (EET)
  - Summer (DST): UTC+3 (EEST)

Napi is a village in Setomaa Parish, Võru County in Estonia.
