= Määsi =

Village in Estonia

- Village
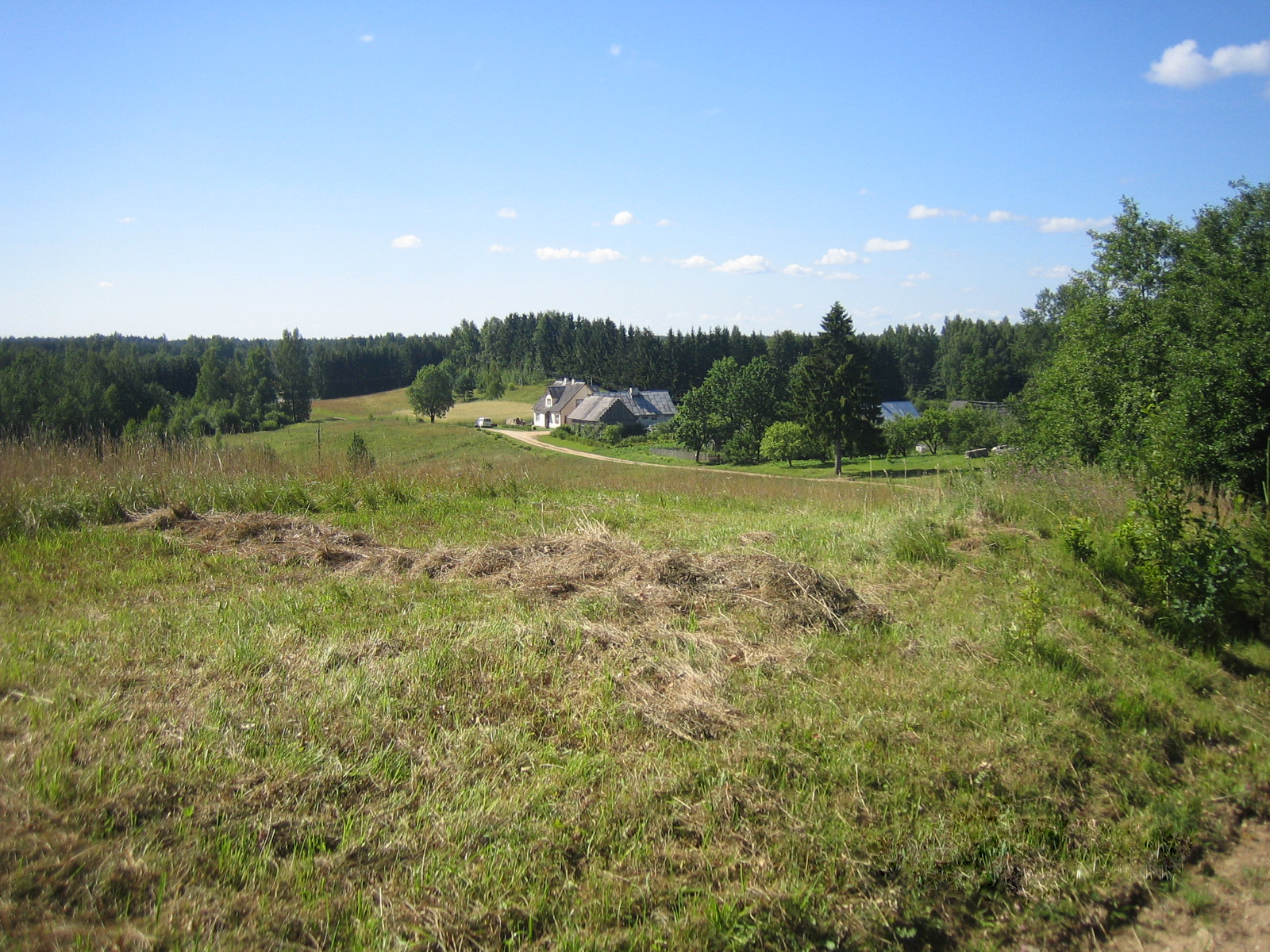
- View from Määsi hill in Määsi village, Setumaa district

- Location within Estonia
- Coordinates: 57.641666666667°N 27.348333333333°E
- Country: Estonia
- County: Võru County
- Parish: Setomaa Parish
- Time zone: UTC+2 (EET)
  - Summer (DST): UTC+3 (EEST)

Määsi is a village in Setomaa Parish, Võru County in Estonia.
