= Samarina, Estonia =

Village in Estonia

Samarina
- Village
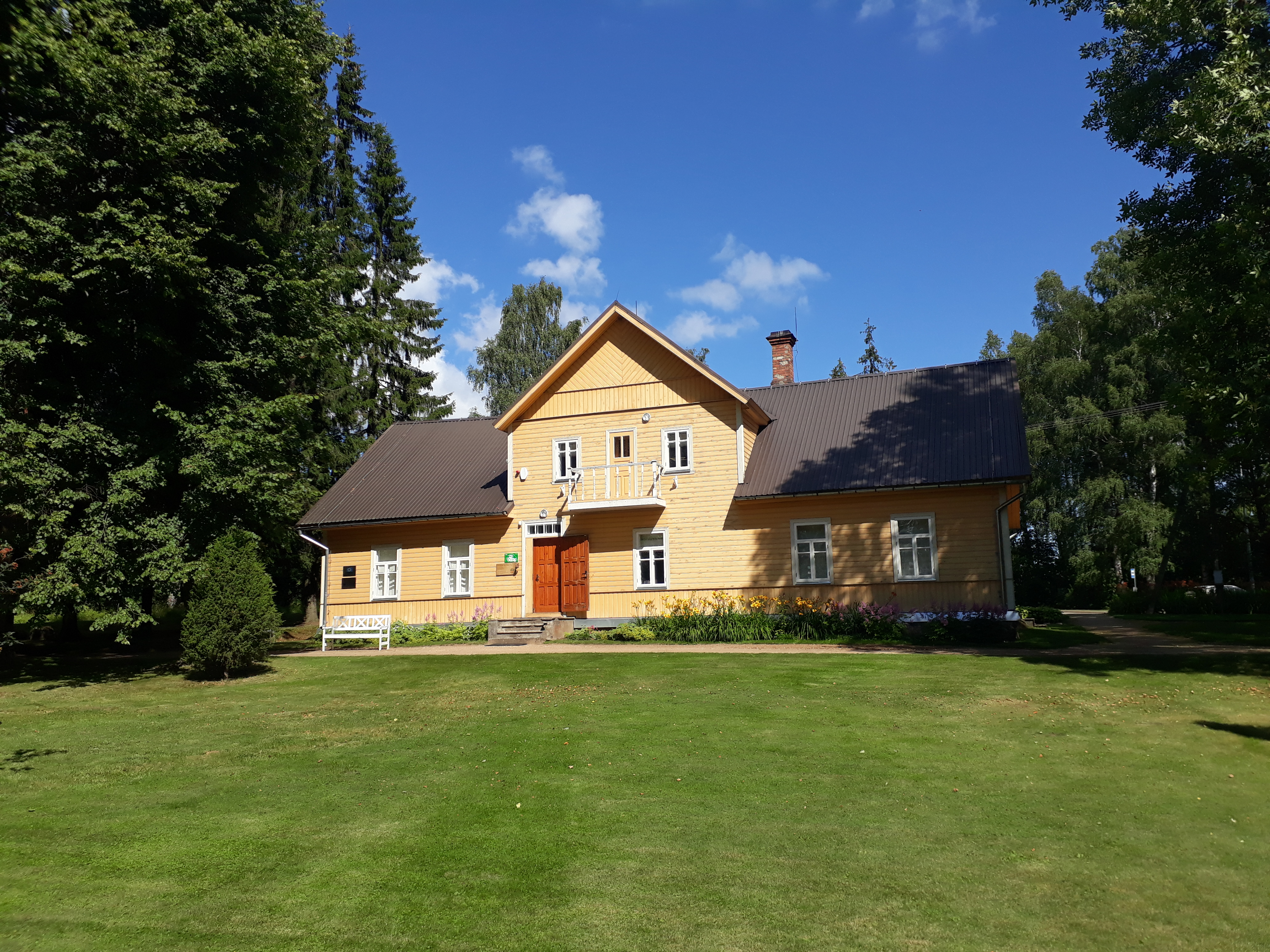
- Saatse Seto Museum

- Location within Estonia
- Coordinates: 57°53′12″N 27°48′5″E
- Country: Estonia
- County: Võru County
- Parish: Setomaa Parish
- Time zone: UTC+2 (EET)
  - Summer (DST): UTC+3 (EEST)

Samarina is a village in Setomaa Parish, Võru County in southeastern Estonia. Prior to the 2017 administrative reform of local governments, it was located in Värska Parish.

== Name ==
Samarina is also known locally as Samarinna. It was attested in historical sources as Шамарины (Shamariny) in 1780, Шамарина (Shamarina) in 1802, Шамарино (Shamarino) in 1872, Самарино (Samarino) in 1885, Самарина (Samarina) in 1890, Samarinna in 1903, Samarina in 1922, Šamarino in 1923, and Шамаринка (Shamarinka) c. 1970. The linguist Jaak Simm assumed that the name of the village comes from the patronymic Самарин (Samarin), which may in turn derive from the name of the city of Samara and Samara River, or from the name of a peasant's long garment: самара (samara), самарка (samarka). According to Anželika Šteingolde, the earliest variant of the name, Шамарины (Shamariny), derives from the surname Шамарин (Shamarin), the origin of which is unclear. It may be related, for example, to the village of Shamary or the Shamarka River. The later variant name Самарино (Samarino) may have come into use under the influence of the name of the first owners of the manor (c. 1802 Самародский, Samarodskiy).

== History ==
Samarina and nearby villages (Kundruse, Litvina, Pattina, Perdaku, Saabolda, Saatse, Sesniki, and Ulitina) are notable as part of Estonia that, although not an enclave, was not reachable by road before 2008 without passing through Russian territory for several hundred metres, through an area known as the Saatse Boot. In 2008, a new road from Matsuri to Sesniki was opened, making it possible to reach the area without necessarily passing through the Saatse Boot. However, this is a 15 to 20 km detour if traveling from Värska.
