= Ulitina =

Village in Estonia

- Village
- Location within Estonia
- Coordinates: 57°52′22″N 27°44′46″E
- Country: Estonia
- County: Võru County
- Parish: Setomaa Parish
- Time zone: UTC+2 (EET)
  - Summer (DST): UTC+3 (EEST)

Ulitina is a village in Setomaa Parish, Võru County in southeastern Estonia. Prior to the 2017 administrative reform of local governments, it was located in Värska Parish.

== Name ==
Ulitina was attested in historical sources as Улитина (Ulitina) in 1780, Улагина (Ulagina) in 1790, (Сельцо) Улитина (Sel′tso Ulitina) in 1829, Ulitino in 1887, Ulitina in 1928, and Ultina in 1945. The linguist Jaak Simm assumed that the name of the village comes from the patronymic Улитинъ (Ulitin), which is derived from Russian Улита (Ulita) 'Julia'. The Russian personal name Улита was already attested in the 16th century, and the patronymic Улитинъ in the 17th century. However, if the toponym is of Estonian origin, it may be compared to South Estonian hulitama 'to shuffle along' or uľľ 'small wave, light undulation'. The linguist Ferdinand Johann Wiedemann also suggest a connection with the masculine name Huľľ.

== History ==
Ulitina and nearby villages (Kundruse, Litvina, Pattina, Perdaku, Saabolda, Saatse, Samarina, and Sesniki) are notable as part of Estonia that, although not an enclave, was not reachable by road before 2008 without passing through Russian territory for several hundred metres, through an area known as the Saatse Boot. In 2008, a new road from Matsuri to Sesniki was opened, making it possible to reach the area without necessarily passing through the Saatse Boot. However, this is a 15 to 20 km detour if traveling from Värska.
