= Litvina =

Village in Estonia

Coordinates: 57°52′40″N 27°47′35″E

- Village
- Interactive map of Litvina
- Country: Estonia
- County: Võru County
- Parish: Setomaa Parish
- Time zone: UTC+2 (EET)
  - Summer (DST): UTC+3 (EEST)

Litvina is a village in Setomaa Parish, Võru County in southeastern Estonia. Prior to the 2017 administrative reform of local governments, it was located in Värska Parish.

== Name ==
Litvina was attested in historical sources as Литвиново (Litvinovo) in 1585, Литвинова (Litvinova) in 1781, Litwinna in 1886, and Litvinna in 1904. The linguist Jaak Simm assumed that the village name is derived from the Russian patronymic Литвинов (Litvinov); the patronymic Литвиновъ (Litvinov″) was recorded in the 15th to 17th centuries, and the Russian surname Литвин (Litvin, also Литвинов, Litvinov) can refer to a Lithuanian, a person from Lithuania or the Polish–Lithuanian Commonwealth, or a Belarusian. This is considered the most likely explanation for the place name by Jüri Truusmann and Anželika Šteingolde.

== History ==
Litvina and nearby villages (Kundruse, Pattina, Perdaku, Saabolda, Saatse, Samarina, Sesniki, and Ulitina) are notable as part of Estonia that, although not an enclave, was not reachable by road before 2008 without passing through Russian territory for several hundred metres, through an area known as the Saatse Boot. In 2008, a new road from Matsuri to Sesniki was opened, making it possible to reach the area without necessarily passing through the Saatse Boot. However, this is a 15 to 20 km detour if traveling from Värska.

== Notable people ==
Notable people that were born or lived in Litvina include the following:

- Arvo Kukumägi (1958–2017), actor
