= Perdaku =

Village in Estonia

- Village
- Location within Estonia
- Coordinates: 57°53′45″N 27°47′30″E
- Country: Estonia
- County: Võru County
- Parish: Setomaa Parish
- Time zone: UTC+2 (EET)
  - Summer (DST): UTC+3 (EEST)

Perdaku (Seto: Perdagu) is a village in Setomaa Parish, Võru County in southeastern Estonia. Prior to the 2017 administrative reform of local governments, it was located in Värska Parish.

== Name ==
Perdaku was attested in historical sources as Пердовка (Perdovka) in 1686, Пюрдова (Pyurdova) in 1792, Бюрдовка (Byurdovka) c. 1866, Pärdagu and Perdagu in 1904, and Perdaga in 1920. The origin of the name is uncertain. One possibility is derivation from South Estonian perdun 'stupid', and a second possibility from the given name Pärt (realized as Pert, genitive Perdi / Perde); Anželika Šteingolde hypothesizes the development Pärt > Перд (Perd) > Пердов (Perdov) > Пердовка (Perdovka) > Perdaku. A third possibility, presented by Jaak Simm, explains the village name based on the nickname Пердун (Perdun) or the patronymic Пердунов (Perdunov) or Пердаков (Perdakov)—related to пердение (perdenie) 'farting', пердак (perdak) 'ass, butt', and пердун (perdun) 'farter; coward, gasbag'. The Old Russian name Пердунъ (Perdun″) was attested in the 15th to 17th centuries, as were the patronymics Пердаковъ (Perdakov″) and Пердуновъ (Perdunov″).

== History ==
Perdaku and nearby villages (Kundruse, Litvina, Pattina, Saabolda, Saatse, Samarina, Sesniki, and Ulitina) are notable as part of Estonia that, although not an enclave, was not reachable by road before 2008 without passing through Russian territory for several hundred metres, through an area known as the Saatse Boot. In 2008, a new road from Matsuri to Sesniki was opened, making it possible to reach the area without necessarily passing through the Saatse Boot. However, this is a 15 to 20 km detour if traveling from Värska.
