= Saabolda =

Village in Estonia

- Village
- Location within Estonia
- Coordinates: 57°52′42″N 27°45′46″E
- Country: Estonia
- County: Võru County
- Parish: Setomaa Parish
- Time zone: UTC+2 (EET)
  - Summer (DST): UTC+3 (EEST)

Saabolda is a village in Setomaa Parish, Võru County in southeastern Estonia. Prior to the 2017 administrative reform of local governments, it was located in Värska Parish.

== Name ==
Saabolda was attested in historical sources as Заболотье (Zabolot′ye) in 1585, Заболотья (Zabolot′ya) in 1780, and Sabola in 1886, among other variations of the name. According to Jaak Simm, the village name derives from the Russian prefix за (za) 'behind' + the stem болото (boloto) 'swamp' + the suffix ье (ye), thus meaning 'place behind the swamp, beyond the swamp'. The place name Заболотье (Zabolot′ye) is common in Russia, Ukraine, and Belarus. Jüri Truusmann suggested a connection with Lithuanian bala 'swamp, mire, morass', Estonian palu 'steppe, sandy spruce forest, dry plain with shrubs', and Finnish paltto, paltta 'slope, edge', but these are not tenable.

== History ==
Saabolda and nearby villages (Kundruse, Litvina, Pattina, Perdaku, Saatse, Samarina, Sesniki, and Ulitina) are notable as part of Estonia that, although not an enclave, was not reachable by road before 2008 without passing through Russian territory for several hundred metres, through an area known as the Saatse Boot. In 2008, a new road from Matsuri to Sesniki was opened, making it possible to reach the area without necessarily passing through the Saatse Boot. However, this is a 15 to 20 km detour if traveling from Värska.
