= Nikolai Põdramägi =

Estonian politician (born 1944)

Nikolai Põdramägi (born 7 January 1944) is an Estonian politician and surgeon. He was a member of XI Riigikogu, representing the Estonian Centre Party.

Nikolai Põdramägi was born in Saabolda. He graduated from Värska Secondary School in 1963 and Tartu State University in 1976. He is a lecturer at the Surgery Clinic of the University of Tartu Hospital and a vascular surgeon.
