= Lutepää =

Village in Estonia

- Village
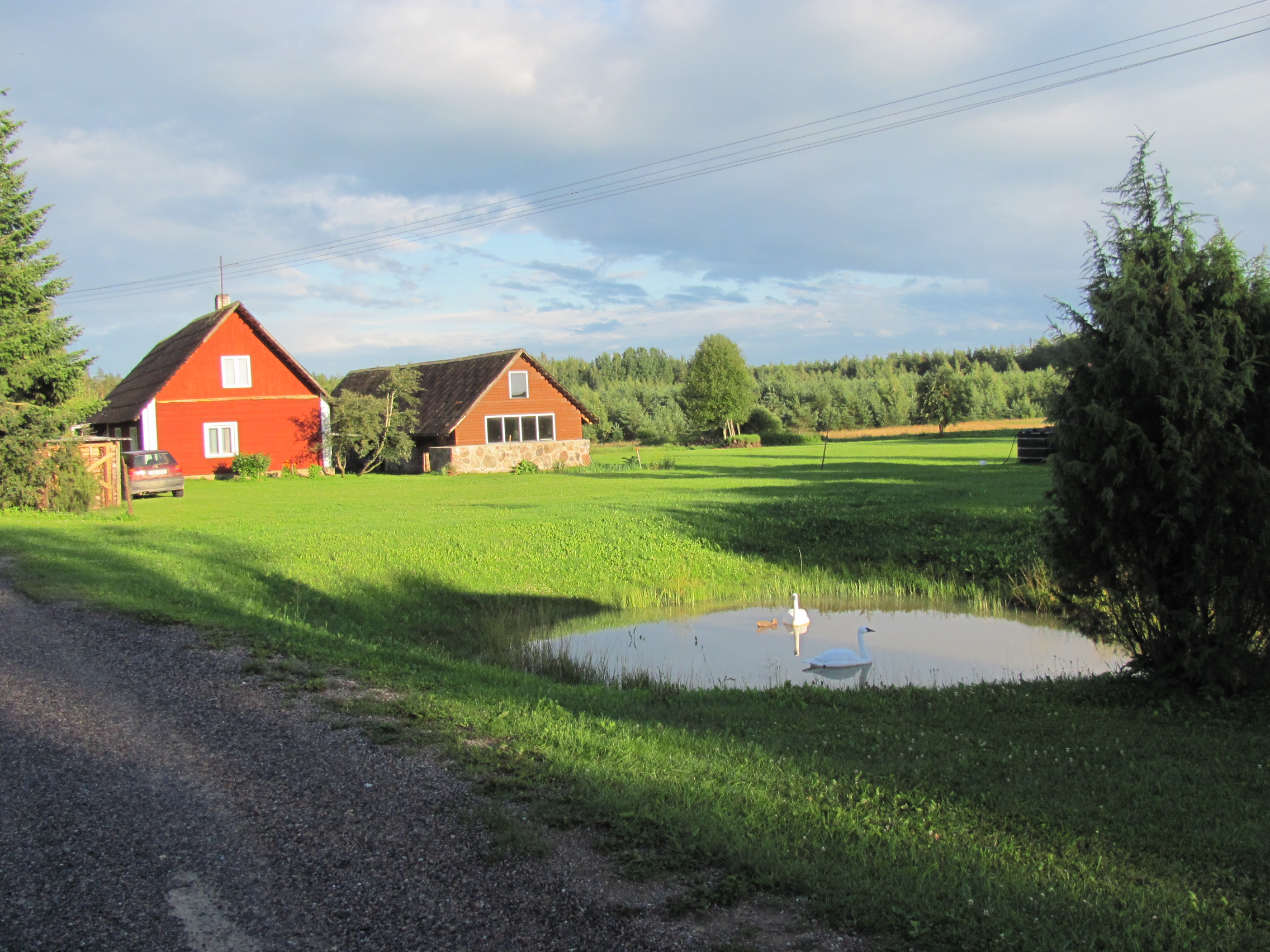

- Location within Estonia
- Coordinates: 57°54′59″N 27°42′40″E
- Country: Estonia
- County: Võru County
- Parish: Setomaa Parish
- Time zone: UTC+2 (EET)
  - Summer (DST): UTC+3 (EEST)

Lutepää is a small village on the Värska-to-Saatse road in southeast Estonia. Prior to the 2017 administrative reform of local governments, it was located in Värska Parish.

Until 2025, Lutepää could only be reached by travelling through Russia. The only road through Lutepää cut, on either side of the village, through Russia's Saatse Boot area, making Lutepää a practical enclave. No Russian visa was required to drive the road to Lutepää, but those in transit by car though the territory of the Russian Federation were not permitted to stop on route.
