= Sesniki =

Village in Estonia

Coordinates: 57°54′N 27°44′E

- Village
- Interactive map of Sesniki
- Country: Estonia
- County: Võru County
- Parish: Setomaa Parish
- Time zone: UTC+2 (EET)
  - Summer (DST): UTC+3 (EEST)

Sesniki is a village in Setomaa Parish, Võru County in southeastern Estonia. Prior to the 2017 administrative reform of local governments, it was located in Värska Parish.

Sesniki and nearby villages (Kundruse, Litvina, Pattina, Perdaku, Saabolda, Saatse, Samarina, and Ulitina) are notable as part of Estonia that, although not an enclave, was not reachable by road before 2008 without passing through Russian territory for several hundred metres, through an area known as the Saatse Boot. In 2008, a new road from Matsuri to Sesniki was opened, making it possible to reach the area without necessarily passing through the Saatse Boot. However, this is a 15 to 20 km detour if traveling from Värska.
