= Saatse =

Village in Estonia

- Village
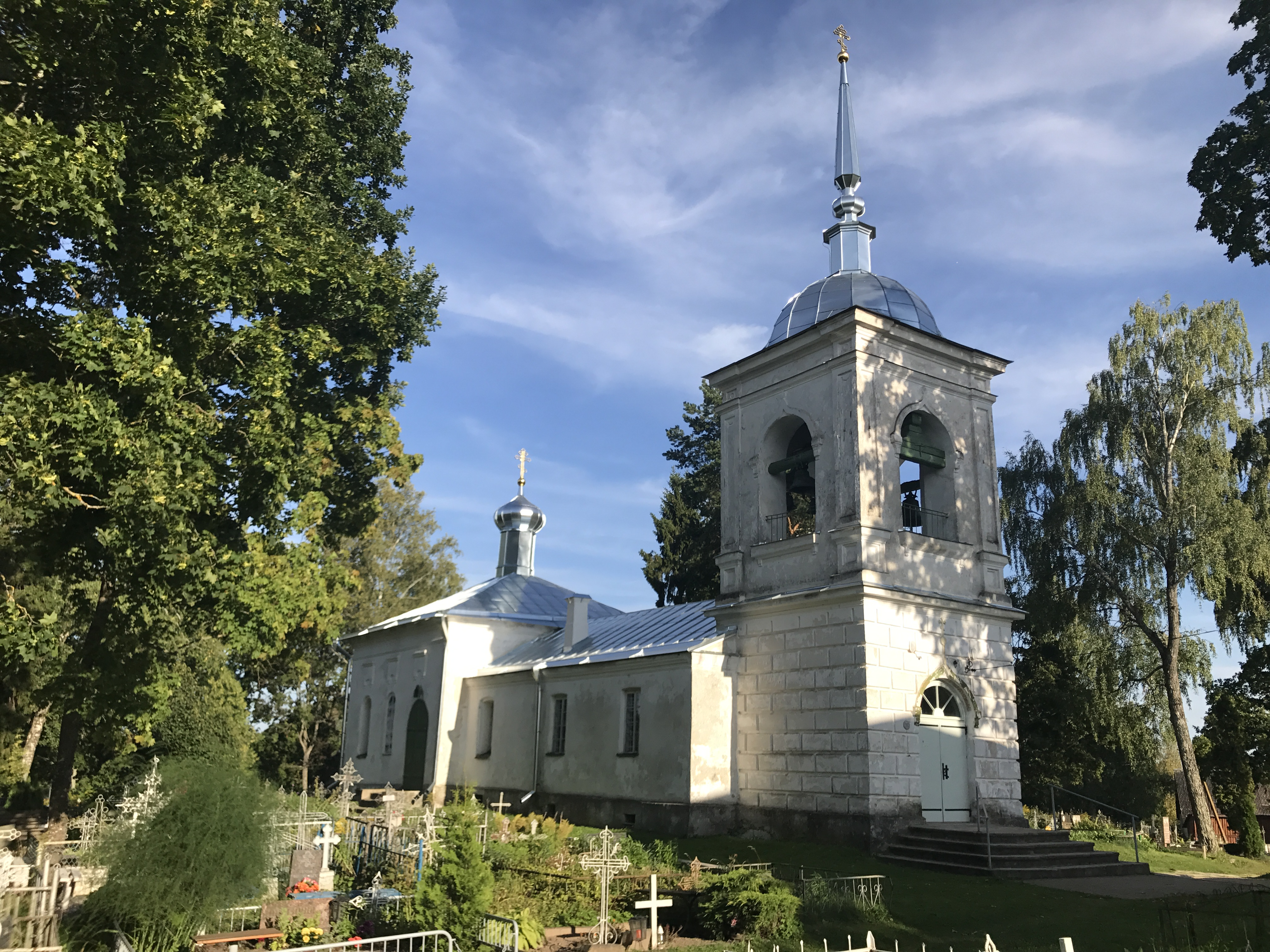
- Paraskeva Friday Church in Saatse

- Location in Estonia
- Coordinates: 57°52′54″N 27°47′20″E
- Country: Estonia
- County: Võru County
- Municipality: Setomaa Parish

Population (2007)
  - Total: 89

Saatse (Seto: Satserina) is a village in Setomaa Parish, Võru County in southeastern Estonia. It has a population of 89 (as of 2007). Prior to the 2017 administrative reform of local governments, it was located in Värska Parish.

Saatse and nearby villages (Kundruse, Litvina, Pattina, Perdaku, Saabolda, Samarina, Sesniki, and Ulitina) are notable as part of Estonia that, although not an enclave, was not reachable by road before 2008 without passing through Russian territory for several hundred metres, through an area known as the Saatse Boot. In 2008, a new road from Matsuri to Sesniki was opened, making it possible to reach the area without necessarily passing through the Saatse Boot. However, this is a 15 to 20 km detour if travelling from Värska.

Saatse was earlier known as Korki or Gorki. The present name Saatse is derived from the Russian village name Зачеренье (Zacherenje), which was later turned into Satseri and then Saatse. It is an area inhabited by Seto people, Setos, who follow Orthodox traditions, and there is a Seto museum. The museum is a subsidiary of the Seto Museum of Farming at Värska, was founded in 1974, and has 20,000 exhibits, including collections of agricultural implements and machinery, fishing equipment, and pottery.

The oldest building in the village is Paraskeva Friday Orthodox Church. The current stone building replaced a wooden structure from 1673 and was constructed in 1801. It had a 22-metre-high (72 ft) wooden belfry added in 1839, and was extended in length in 1884.
