= Sapina =

Sapina may refer to:

- Säpina, a village in Setomaa Parish, Võru County, Estonia
- Jérémy Sapina (born 1985), French footballer
- Ivan Šapina (born 1999), Croatian taekwondo practitioner
- Vinko Šapina (born 1995), German footballer
