= Värska Parish =

Former municipality of Estonia

Coordinates: 57°57′28″N 27°37′59″E

Värska Parish Värska vald
- Former municipality of Estonia
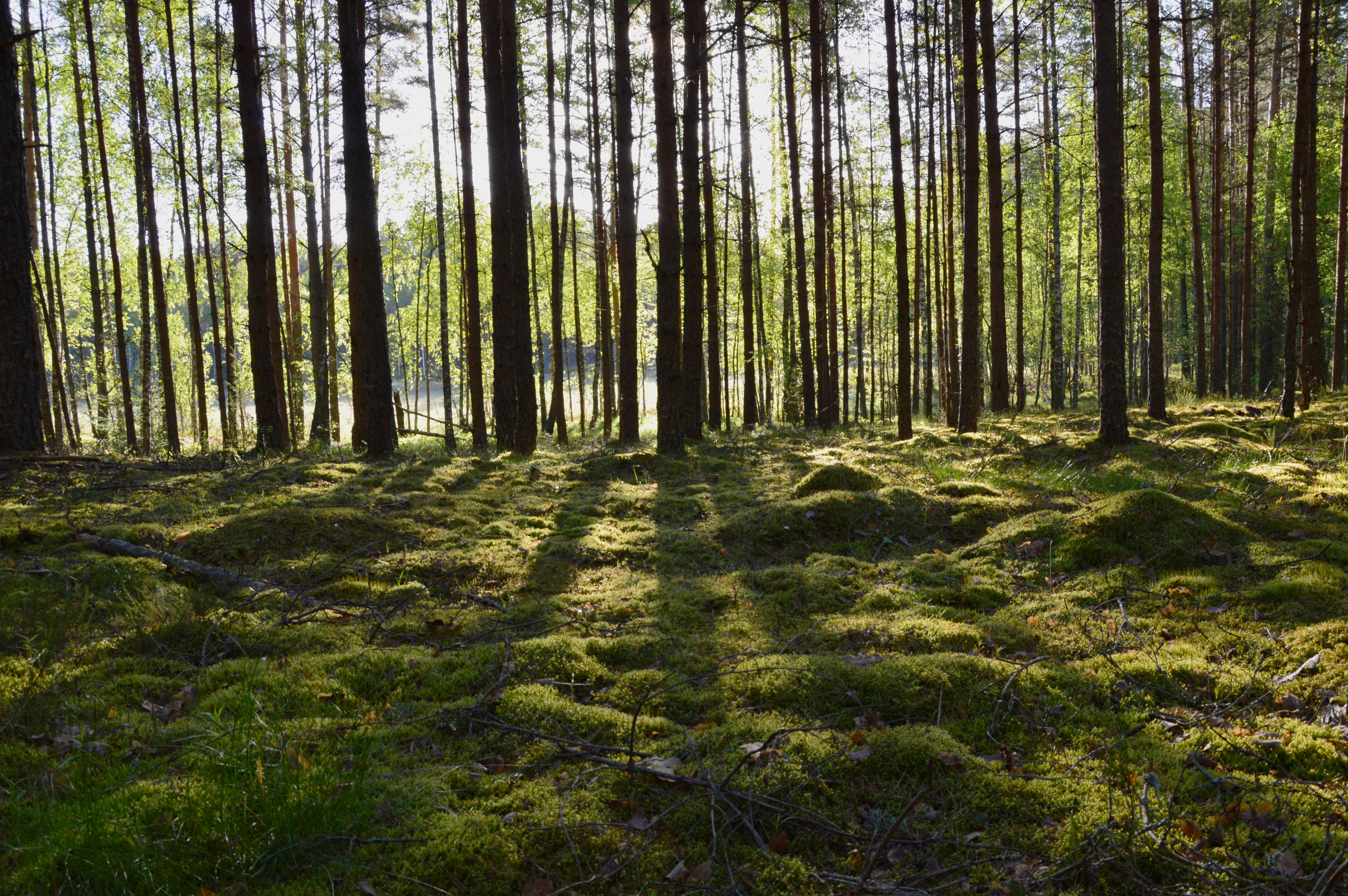
- Mustoja Landscape Conservation Area

- Coat of arms

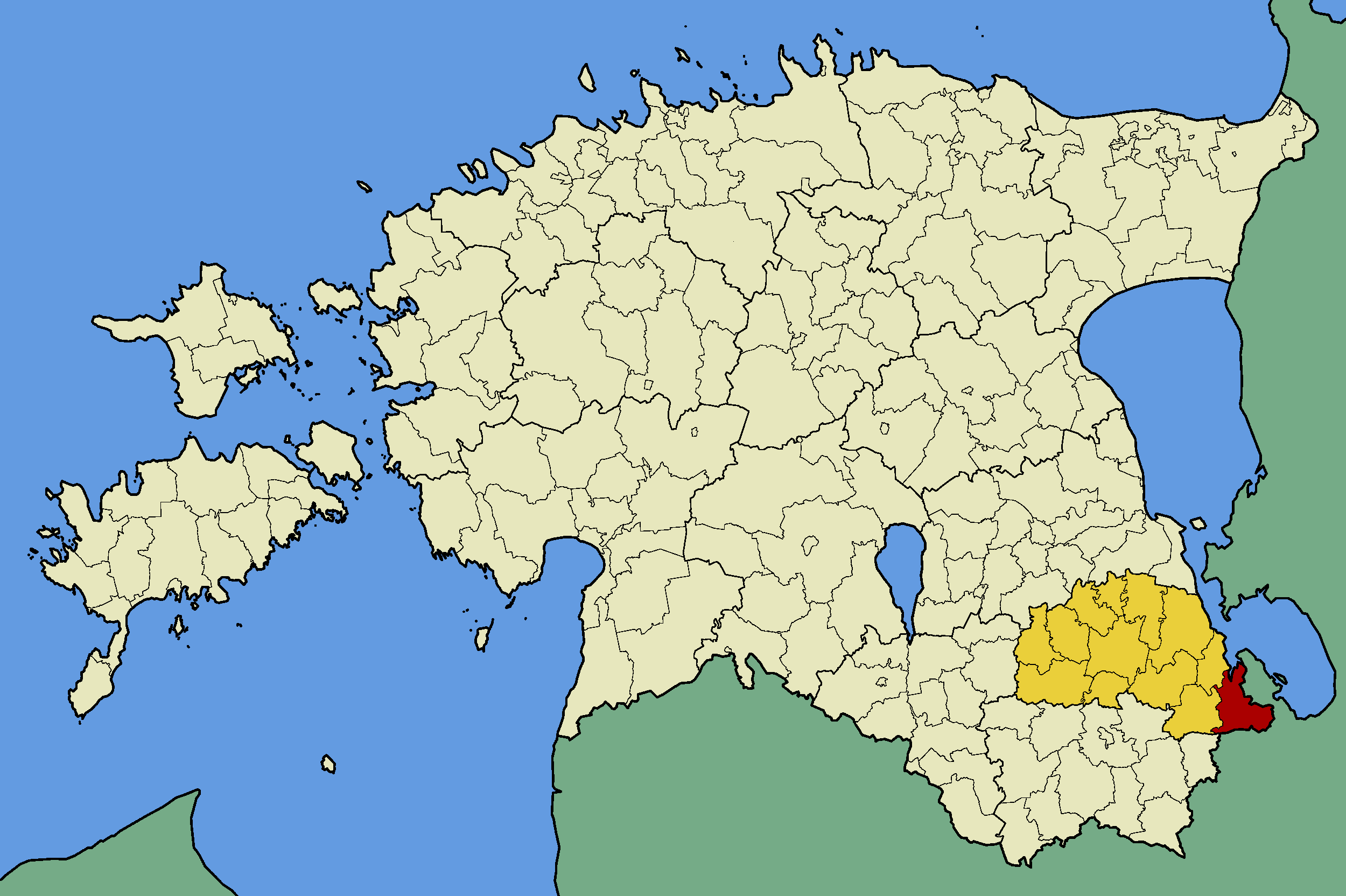
- Värska Parish within Põlva County.
- Country: Estonia
- County: Põlva County
- Administrative centre: Värska

Area
  - Total: 187.82 km^{2} (72.52 sq mi)

Population (01.01.2009)
  - Total: 1,344
  - Density: 7.156/km^{2} (18.53/sq mi)
- Website: www.verska.ee

Värska Parish (Estonian: Värska vald) was a rural municipality of Estonia, in Põlva County. It had a population of 1,344 (as of 1 January 2009) and an area of 187.82 km^{2} (72.52 sq mi).

== Settlements ==
Small borough

Värska

Villages

Koidula • Kolodavitsa • Kolossova • Korela • Kostkova • Kremessova • Kundruse • Litvina • Lobotka • Lutepää • Määsovitsa • Matsuri • Nedsaja • Õrsava • Pattina • Perdaku • Podmotsa • Popovitsa • Rääptsova • Saabolda • Saatse • Samarina • Säpina • Sesniki • Tonja • Treski • Ulitina • Vaartsi • Väike-Rõsna • Vedernika • Velna • Verhulitsa • Võpolsova • Voropi

== Gallery ==
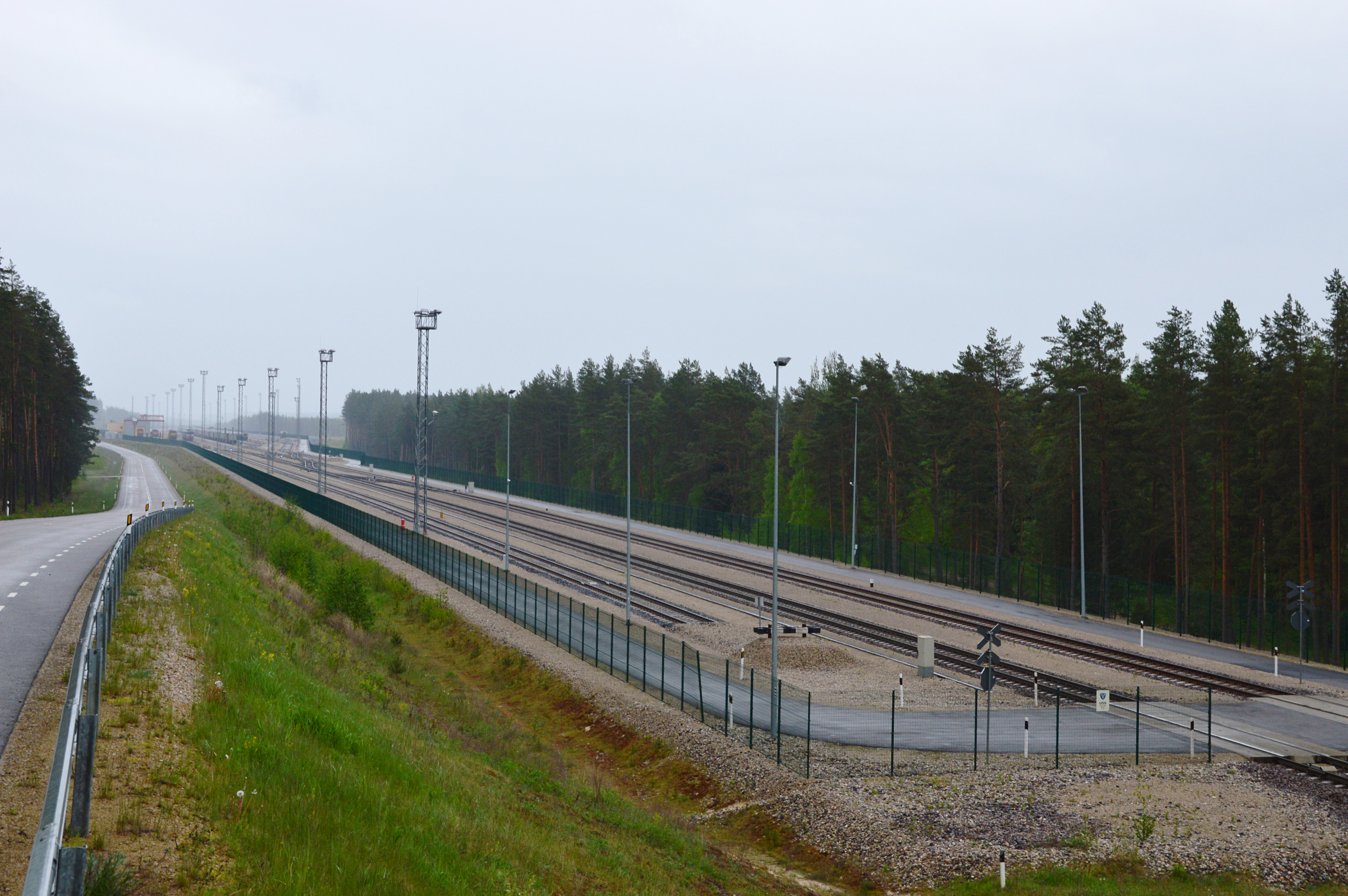
Koidula railway station

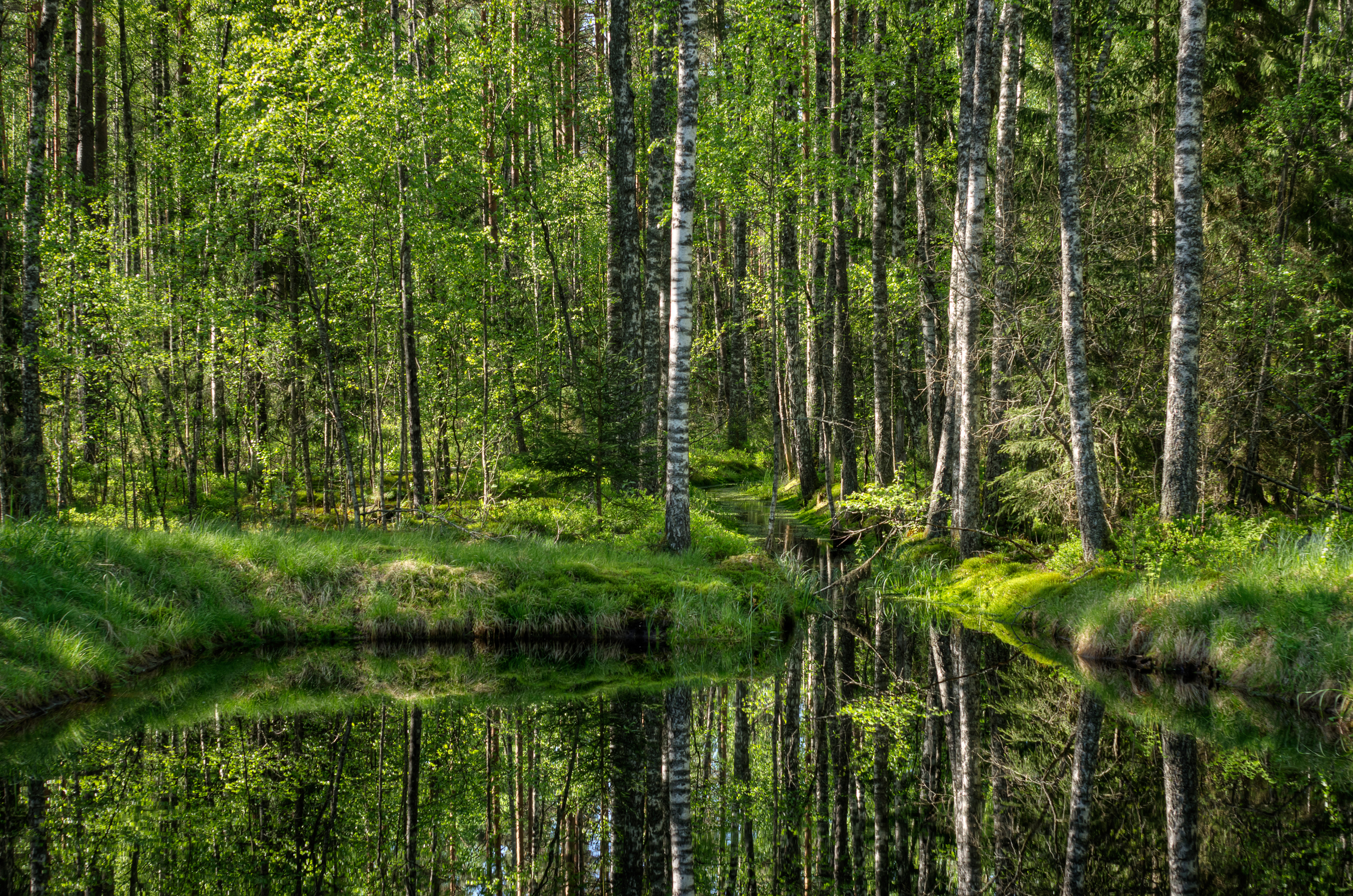
Mustoja Landscape Conservation Area is the biggest protected area in Põlva County

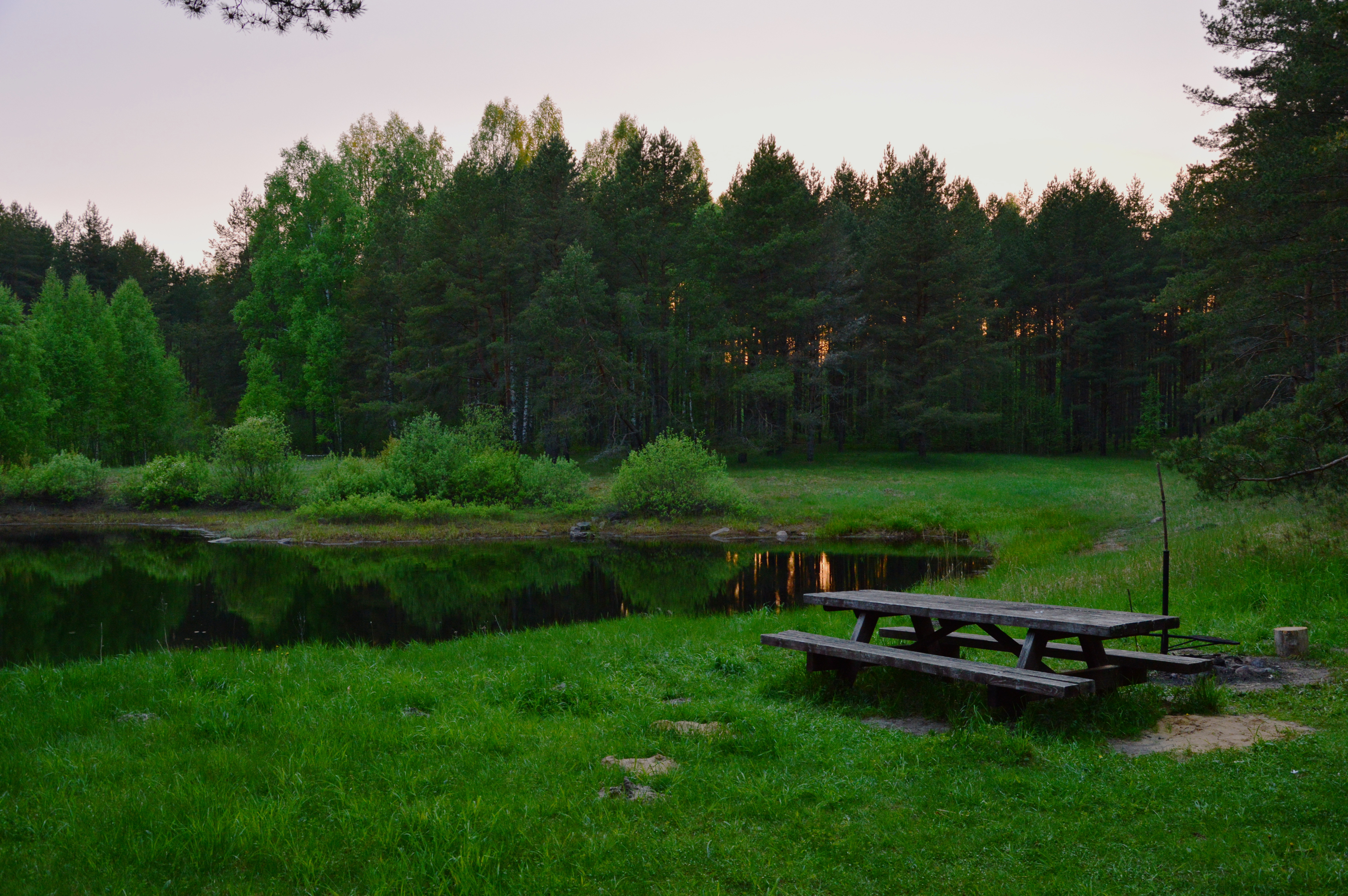
Poogandi Lake in Mustoja Nature Reserve

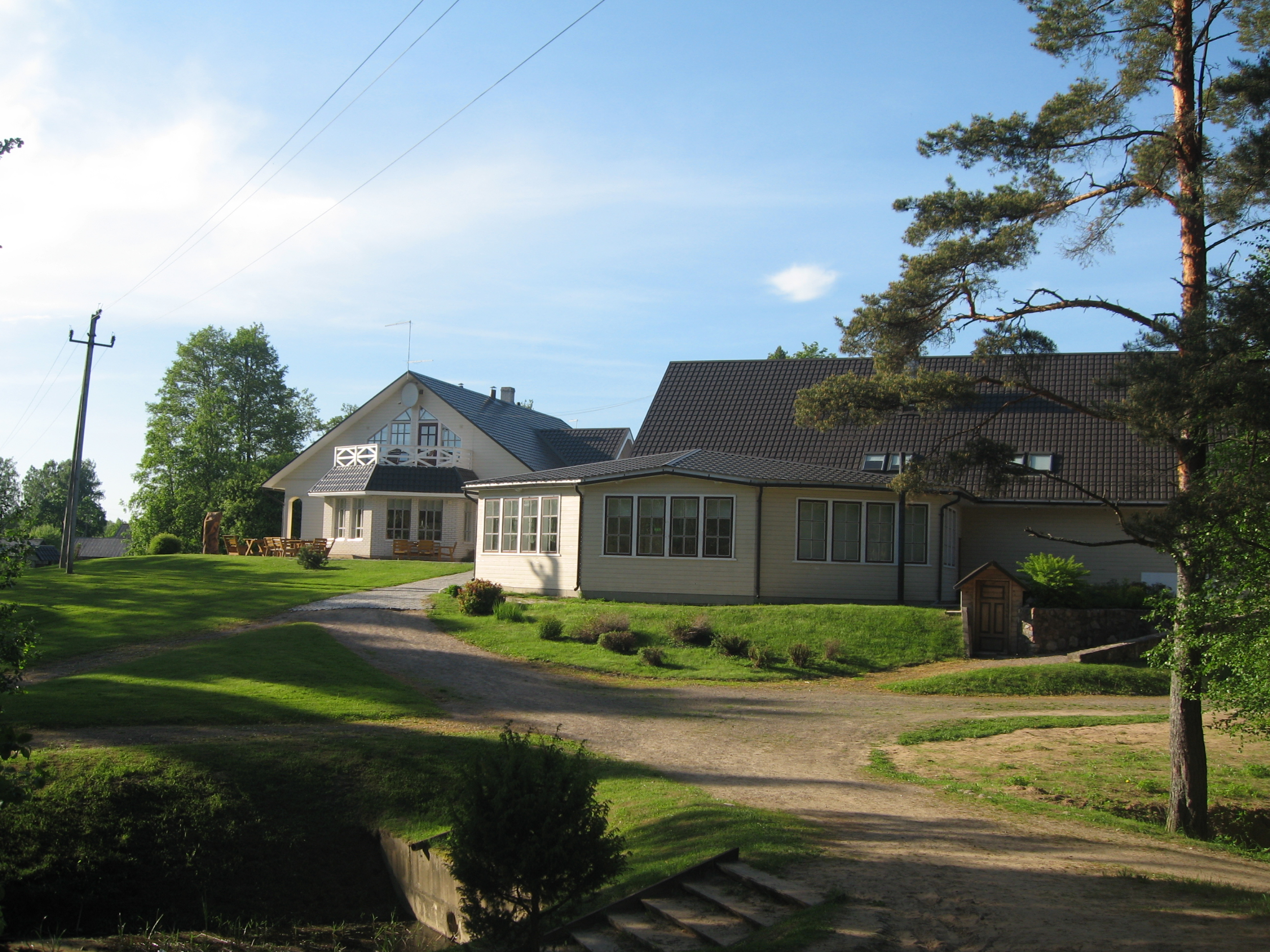
Hirvemäe Holiday Centre

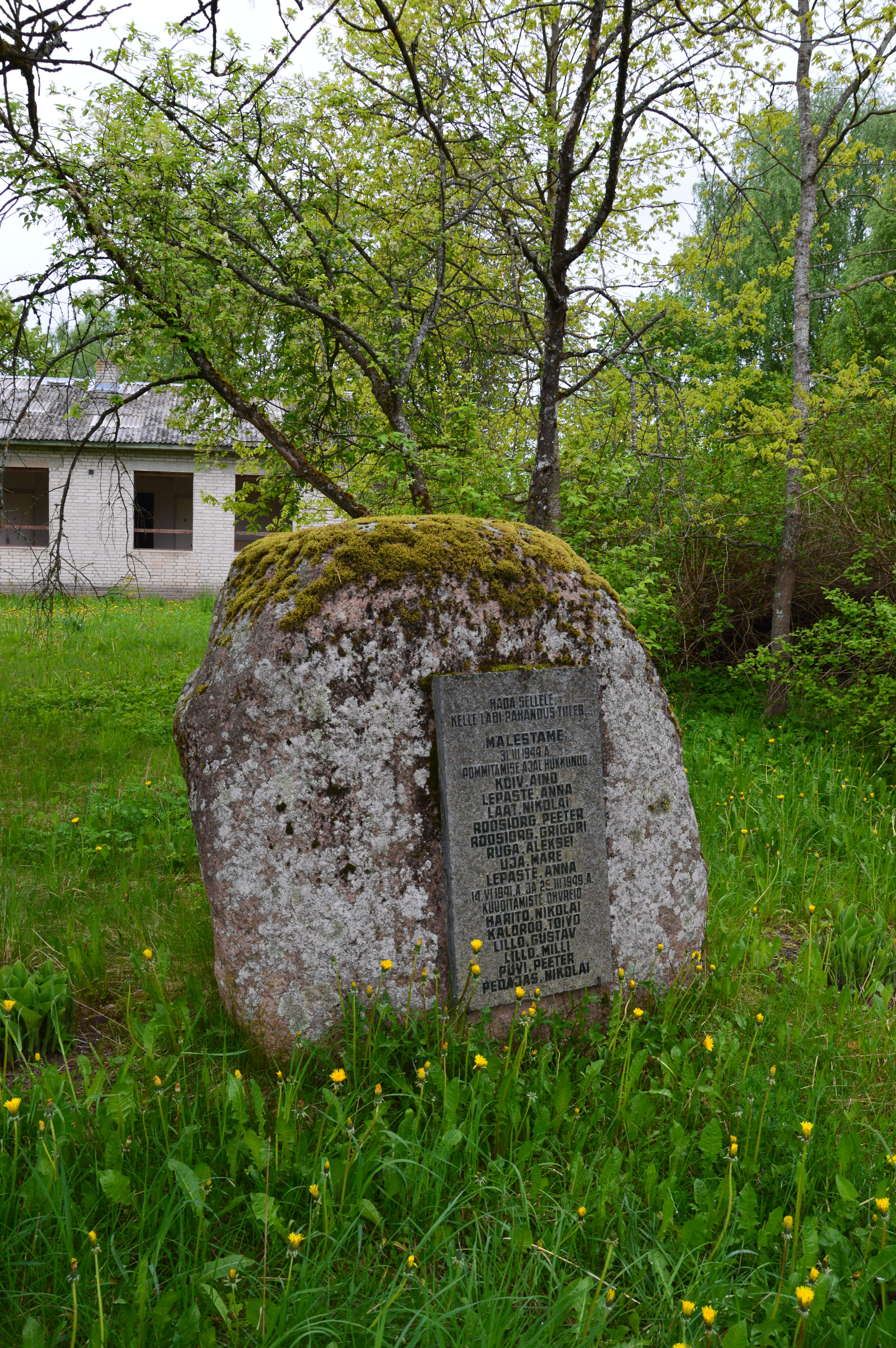
Memorial stone in Säpina village

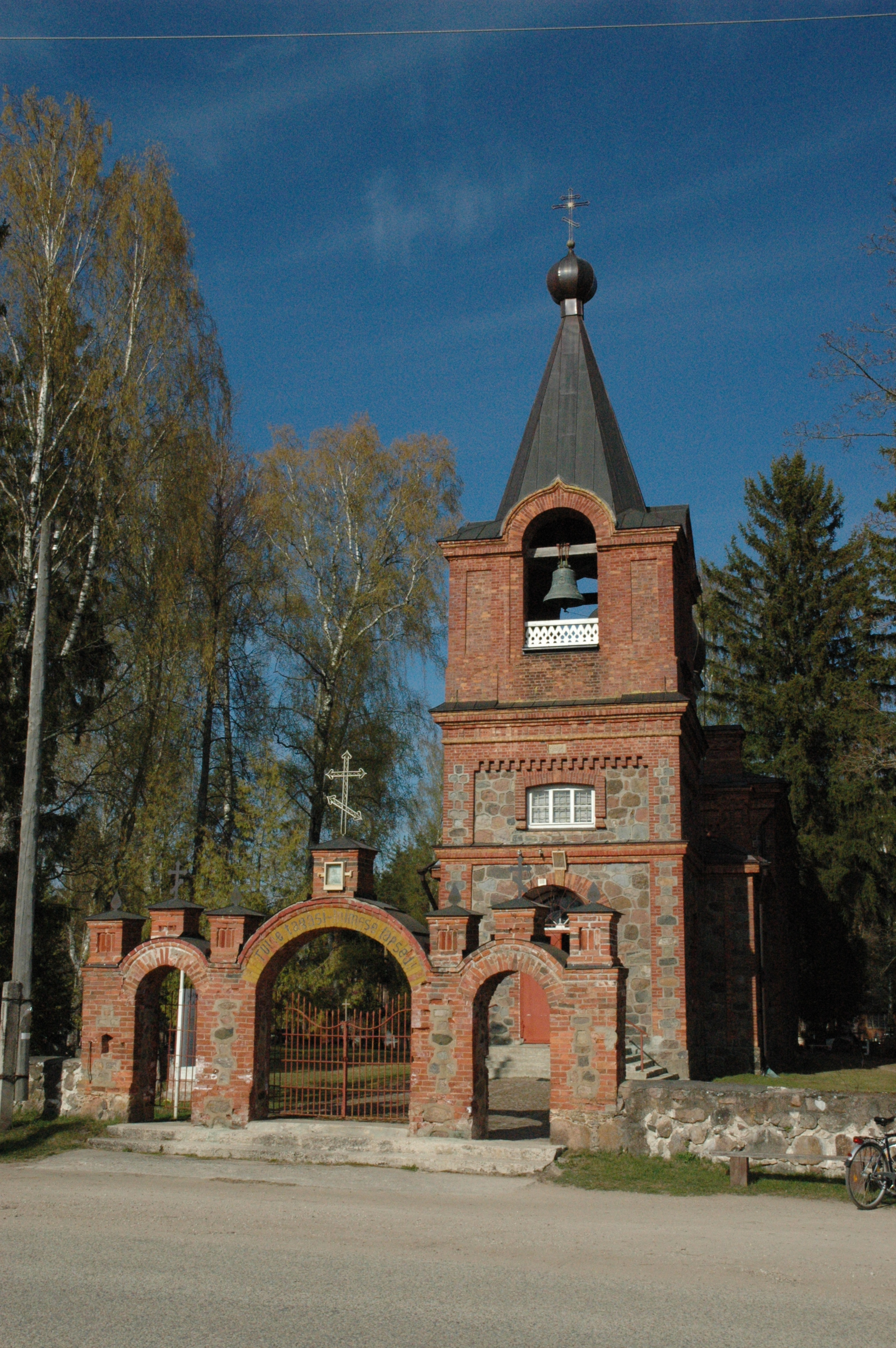
Värska Orthodox Church

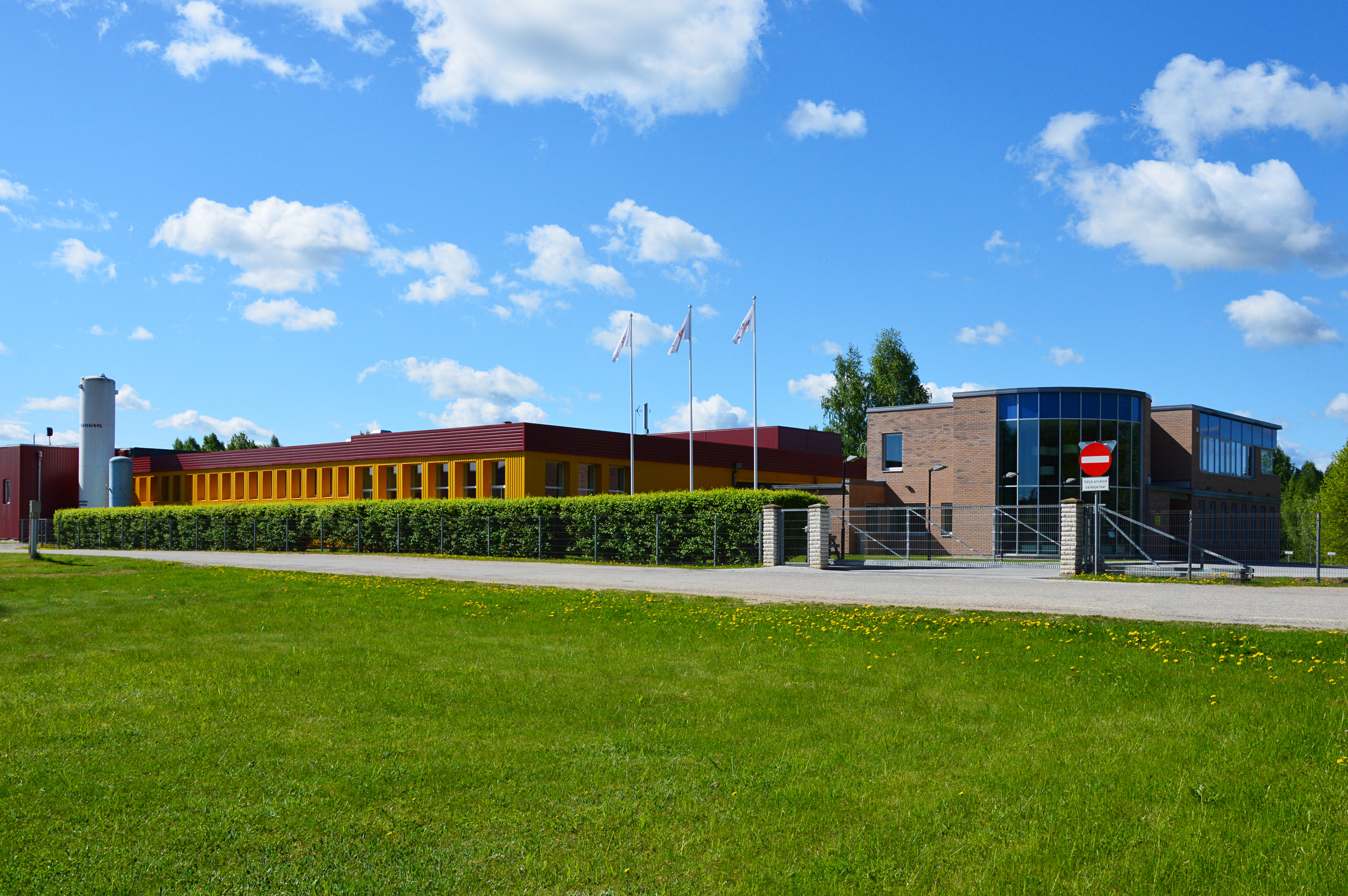
Värska Vesi AS company which produces mineral water

== See also ==
- Saatse Boot
