= Kolodavitsa =

Village in Estonia

- village
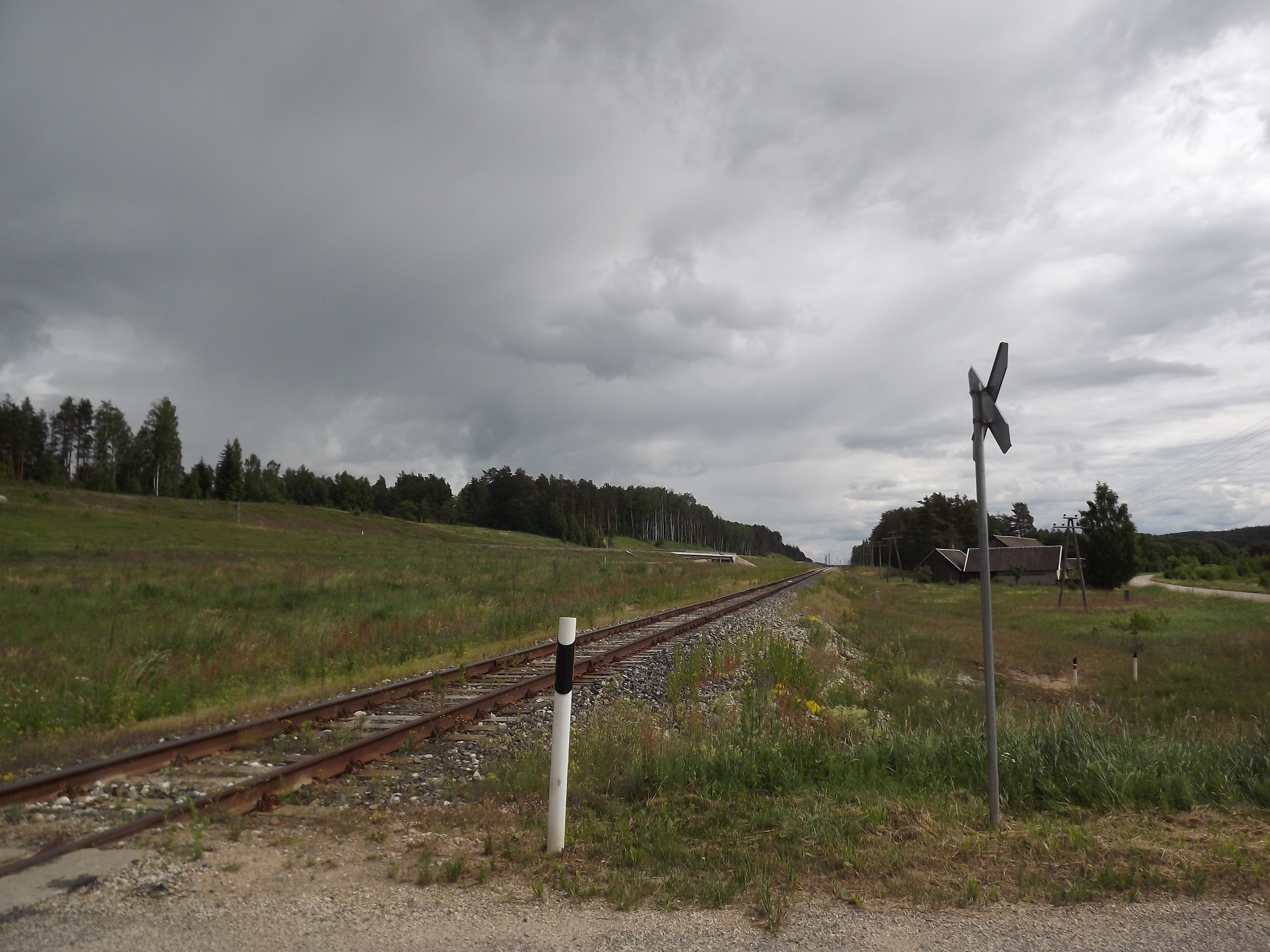
- Former Veski railway station

- Location in Estonia
- Coordinates: 57°50′35″N 27°33′04″E
- Country: Estonia
- County: Võru County
- Municipality: Setomaa Parish

Population (01.01.2011)
  - Total: 34

Kolodavitsa is a village in Setomaa Parish, Võru County, in southeastern Estonia, on the border with Russia. Tartu–Pechory and Valga–Pechory railways pass Kolodavitsa and cross the border in nearby Koidula village. Currently there's only freight traffic on Tartu–Pechory. Kolodavitsa has a station named "Veski" on the Valga–Pechory line, but it's inactive since 2001. At the moment new Koidula railway station is being built in the neighbouring Matsuri village, this enables the traffic between Tartu–Pechory and Valga–Pechory lines without crossing the Russian border. Prior to the 2017 administrative reform of local governments, it was located in Värska Parish.

Kolodavitsa has a population of 34 (as of 1 January 2011).
