= Paul Haavaoks =

Estonian poet

Paul Haavaoks (12 April 1924 Värska, Setumaa – 30 September 1983) was an Estonian poet.

He had several jobs. For some time, he was a member of the Saatse Parish executive committee. He was also a member of the editorial office of the newspaper Koit in Põlva. He started working as a professional writer in 1955.

== Selected works ==
- 1970: Sipelgarada (Ants' Trail), poetry collection
- 1974: Eelkarastumine (Prior Tempering), memoir
- 1977: Kanajala linnajagu (The Kanajala District), poetry collection
