= Podmotsa =

Village in Estonia

- Village
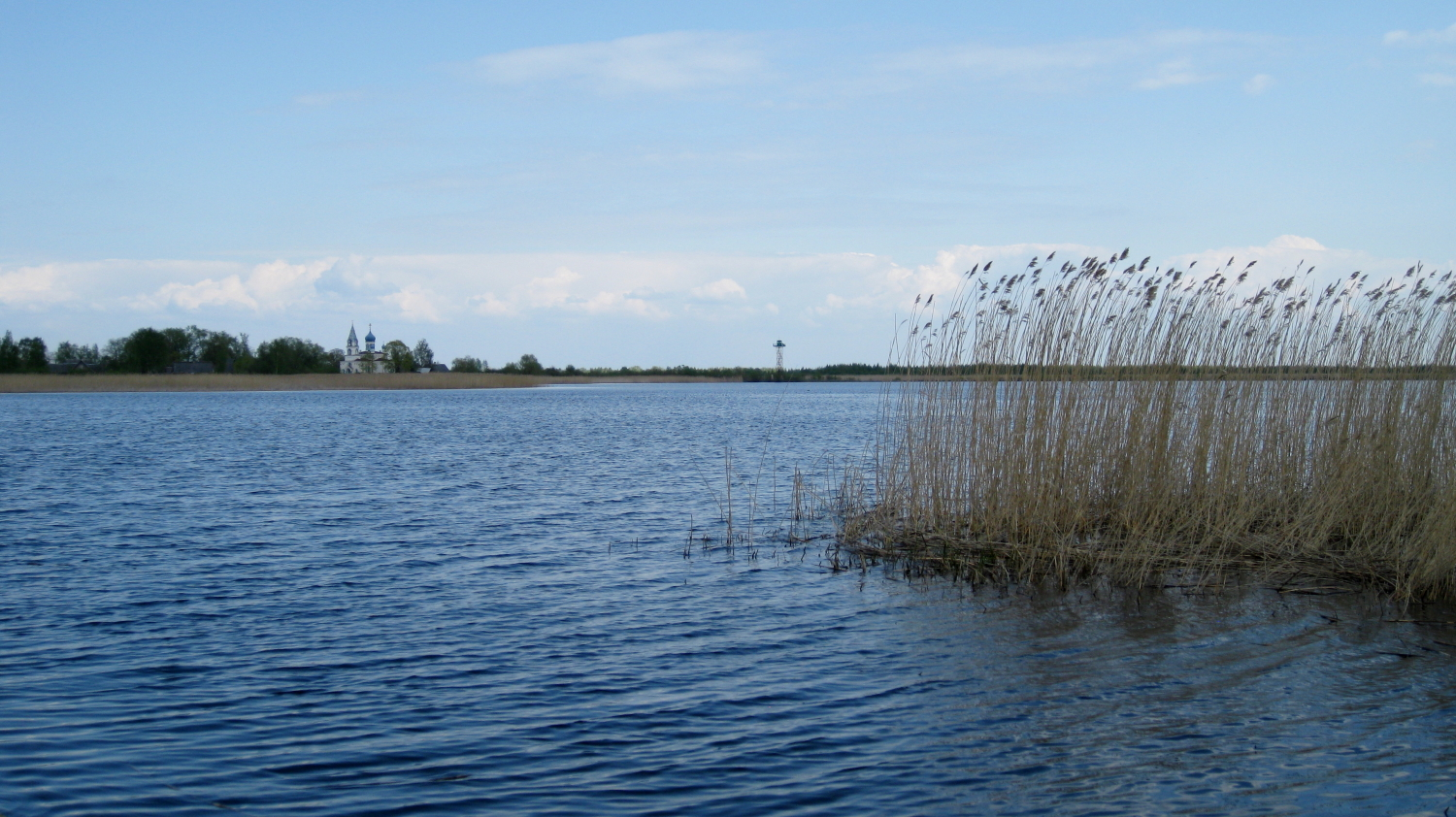
- View from Podmotsa over the bay to Kulje, Russia.

- Location within Estonia
- Coordinates: 58°0′30″N 27°39′44″E
- Country: Estonia
- County: Võru County
- Parish: Setomaa Parish
- Time zone: UTC+2 (EET)
  - Summer (DST): UTC+3 (EEST)

Podmotsa is a village in Setomaa Parish, Võru County in southeastern Estonia. Prior to the 2017 administrative reform of local governments, it was located in Värska Parish.
