= Õrsava =

Village in Estonia

Coordinates: 57°57′N 27°38′E

- Village
- Interactive map of Õrsava
- Country: Estonia
- County: Võru County
- Parish: Setomaa Parish
- Time zone: UTC+2 (EET)
  - Summer (DST): UTC+3 (EEST)

Õrsava is a village in Setomaa Parish, Võru County in southeastern Estonia. Prior to the 2017 administrative reform of local governments, it was located in Värska Parish.
