= Väike-Rõsna =

Village in Estonia

Coordinates: 57°59′N 27°38′E

- Village
- Interactive map of Väike-Rõsna
- Country: Estonia
- County: Võru County
- Parish: Setomaa Parish

Population (2022 )
  - Total: 100
  - Density: 45.5/km^{2} (118/sq mi)
- Time zone: UTC+2 (EET)
  - Summer (DST): UTC+3 (EEST)

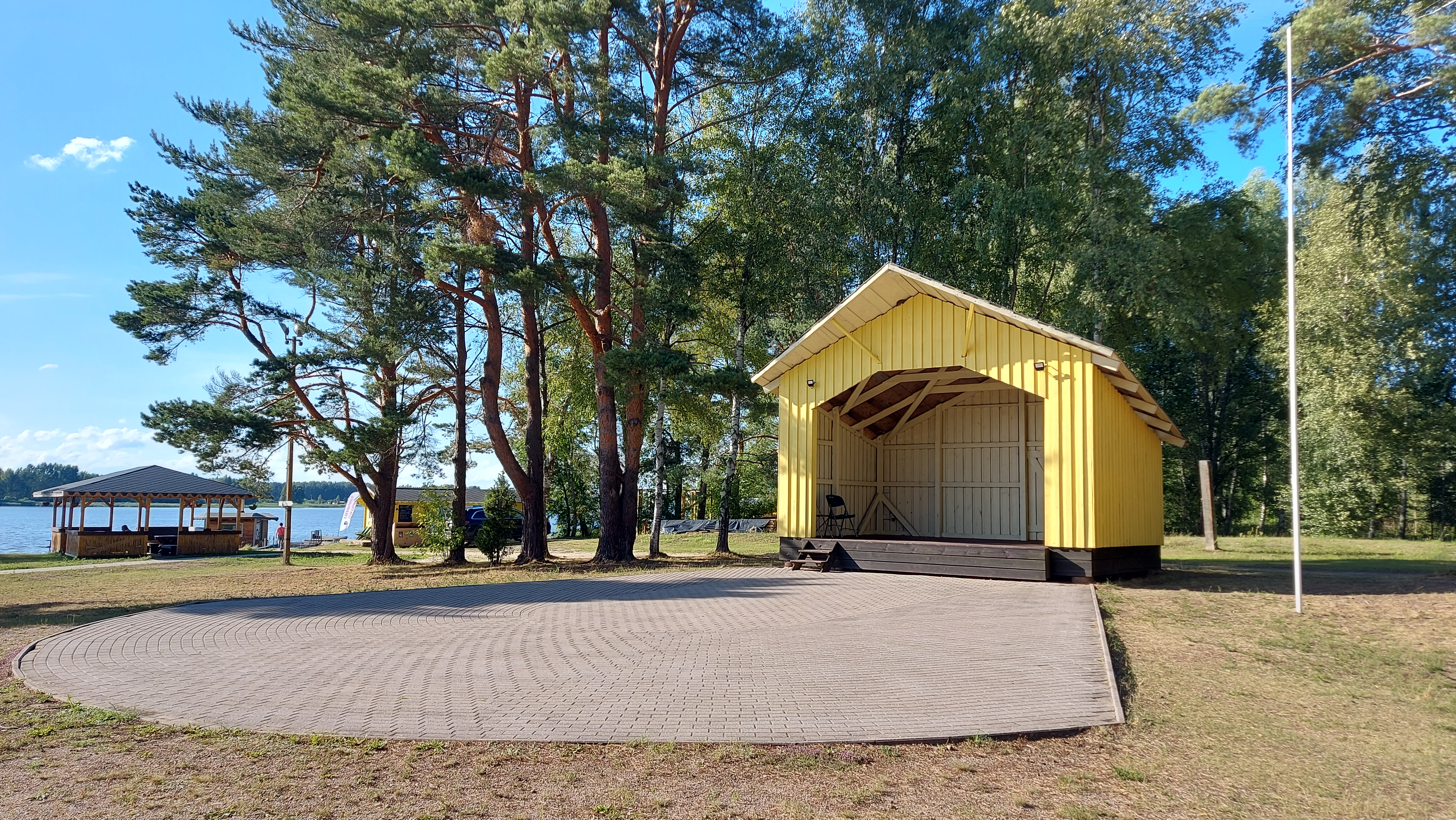
A singing stage in the park of the Värska sanatorium in the village of Väike-Rõsna.

Väike-Rõsna is a village in Setomaa Parish, Võru County in southeastern Estonia. Prior to the 2017 administrative reform of local governments, it was located in Värska Parish.
