= Mustoja Landscape Conservation Area =

Protected area in Estonia

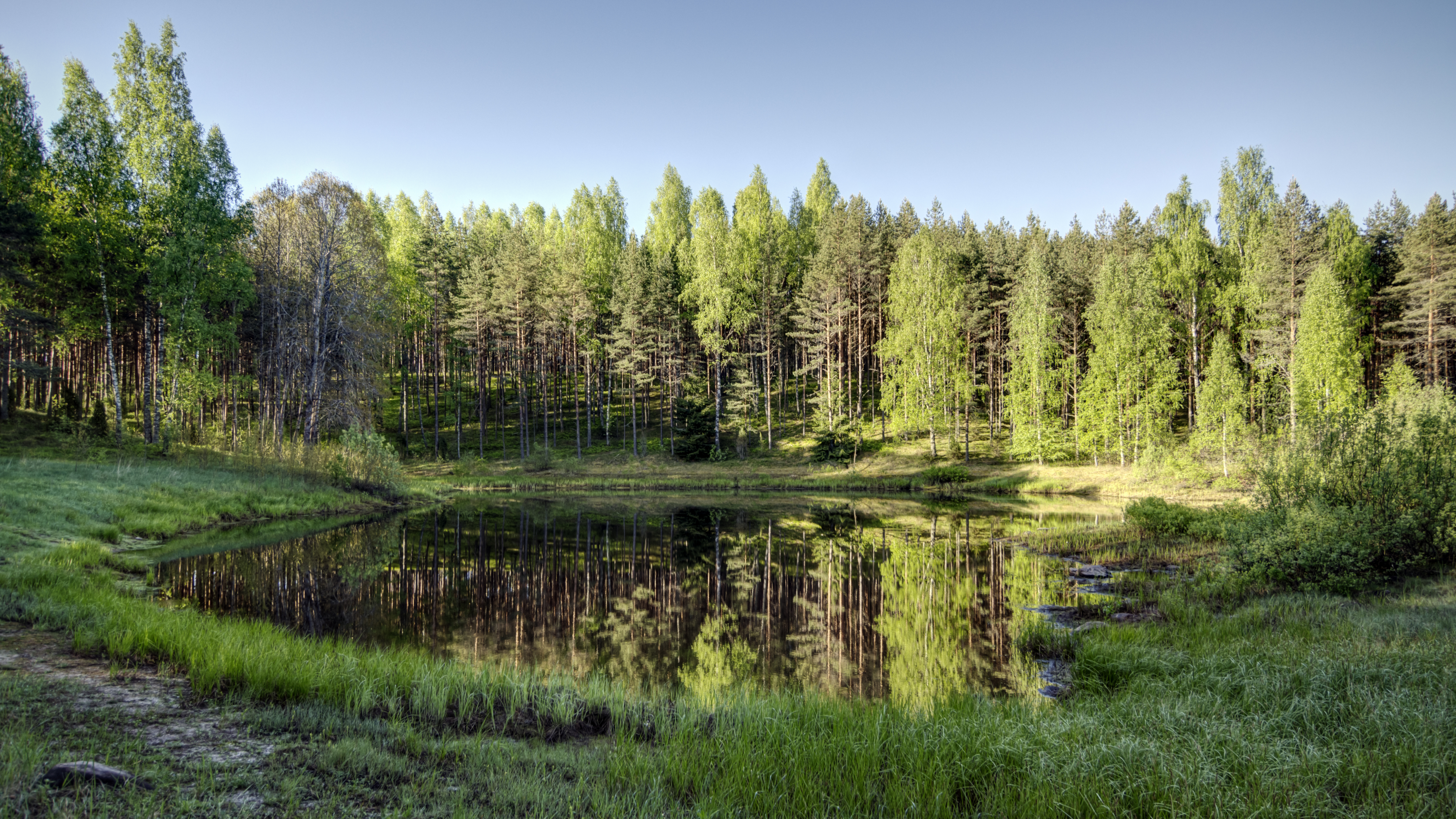

- Location within Estonia
- Location: Estonia
- Coordinates: 57°54′N 27°39′E
- Area: 3,488 ha (8,620 acres)
- Established: 1998 (2005)

Mustoja Landscape Conservation Area is a nature park is located in Võru County, Estonia.

The area of the nature park is 3488 ha.

The protected area was founded in 1998 to protect rare landforms and forest ecosystems near Mustoja River.
