= Säpina =

Village in Estonia

Coordinates: 57°51′08″N 27°34′54″E

- Village
- Interactive map of Säpina
- Country: Estonia
- County: Võru County
- Parish: Setomaa Parish
- Time zone: UTC+2 (EET)
  - Summer (DST): UTC+3 (EEST)

Säpina (Seto: Säpinde) is a village in Setomaa Parish, Võru County in southeastern Estonia. Prior to the 2017 administrative reform of local governments, it was located in Värska Parish.

== Gallery ==
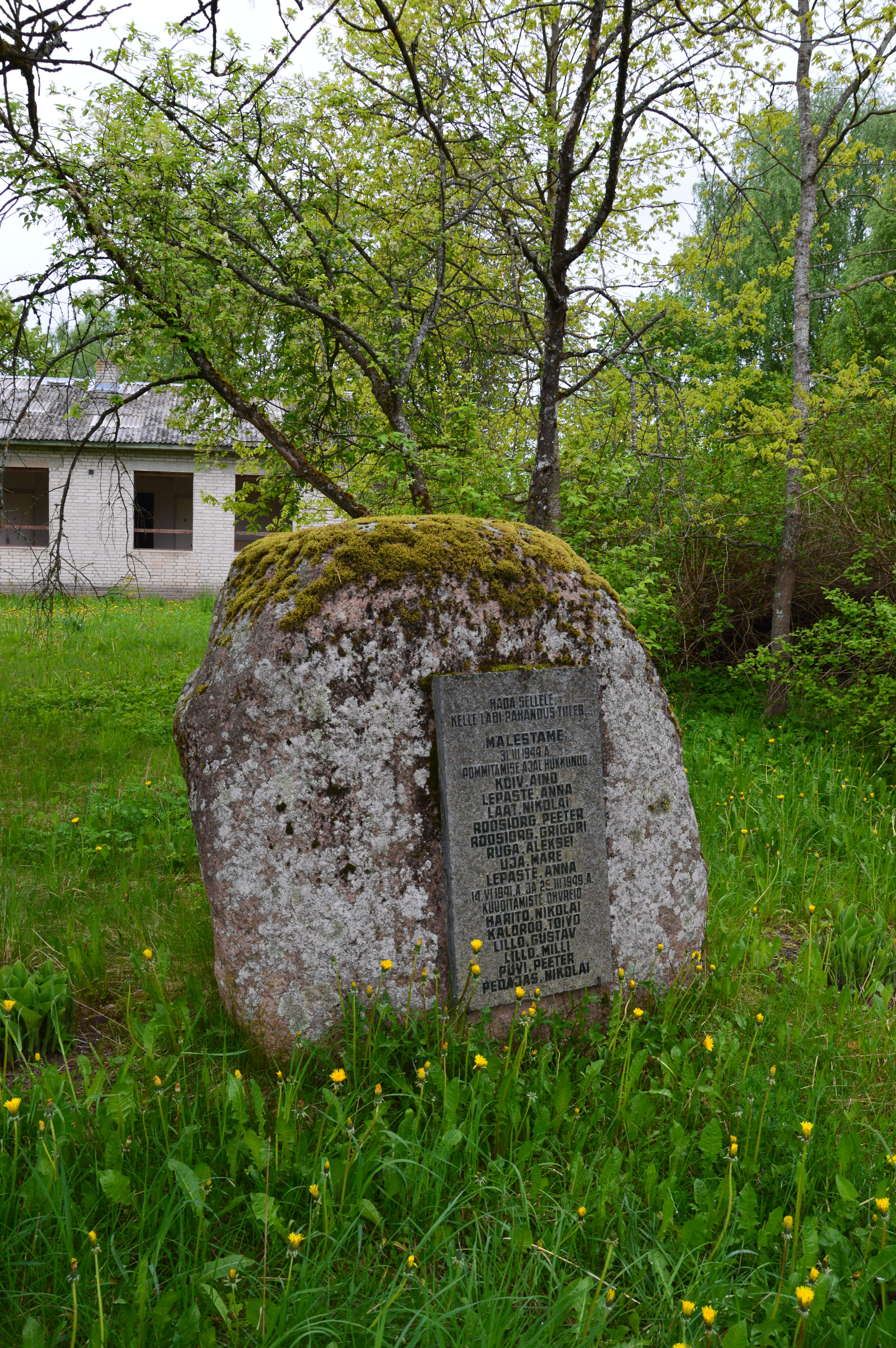

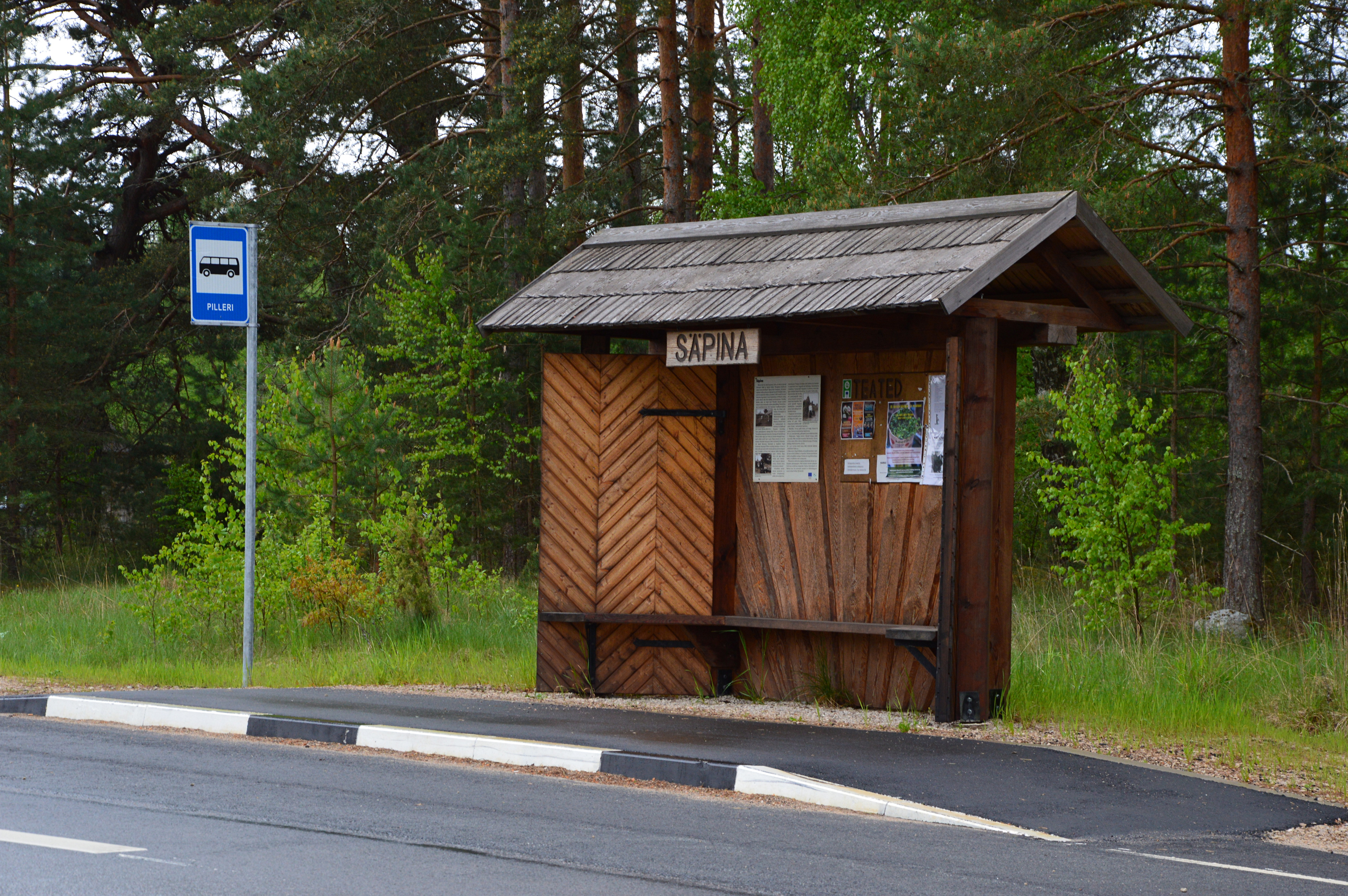
