= Shamary, Perm Krai =

Shamary Шамары
- Village
- Location within Perm Krai Location within Russia
- Coordinates: 57°4′N 54°26′E
- Country: Russia
- Region: Perm Krai
- District: Bolshesosnovsky District
- Time zone: UTC+5:00

Shamary (Russian: Шамары) is a rural locality (a village) in Klenovskoye Selsoviet, Bolshesosnovsky District, Perm Krai, Russia. The population was 17 as of 2010. There is 1 street.

== Geography ==
Shamary is located 15 km northwest of Bolshaya Sosnova (the district's administrative centre) by road. Zabolotovo is the nearest rural locality.
