= Seto Museum of Farming =

Museum in Estonia

Coordinates: 57.9422°N 27.6515°E

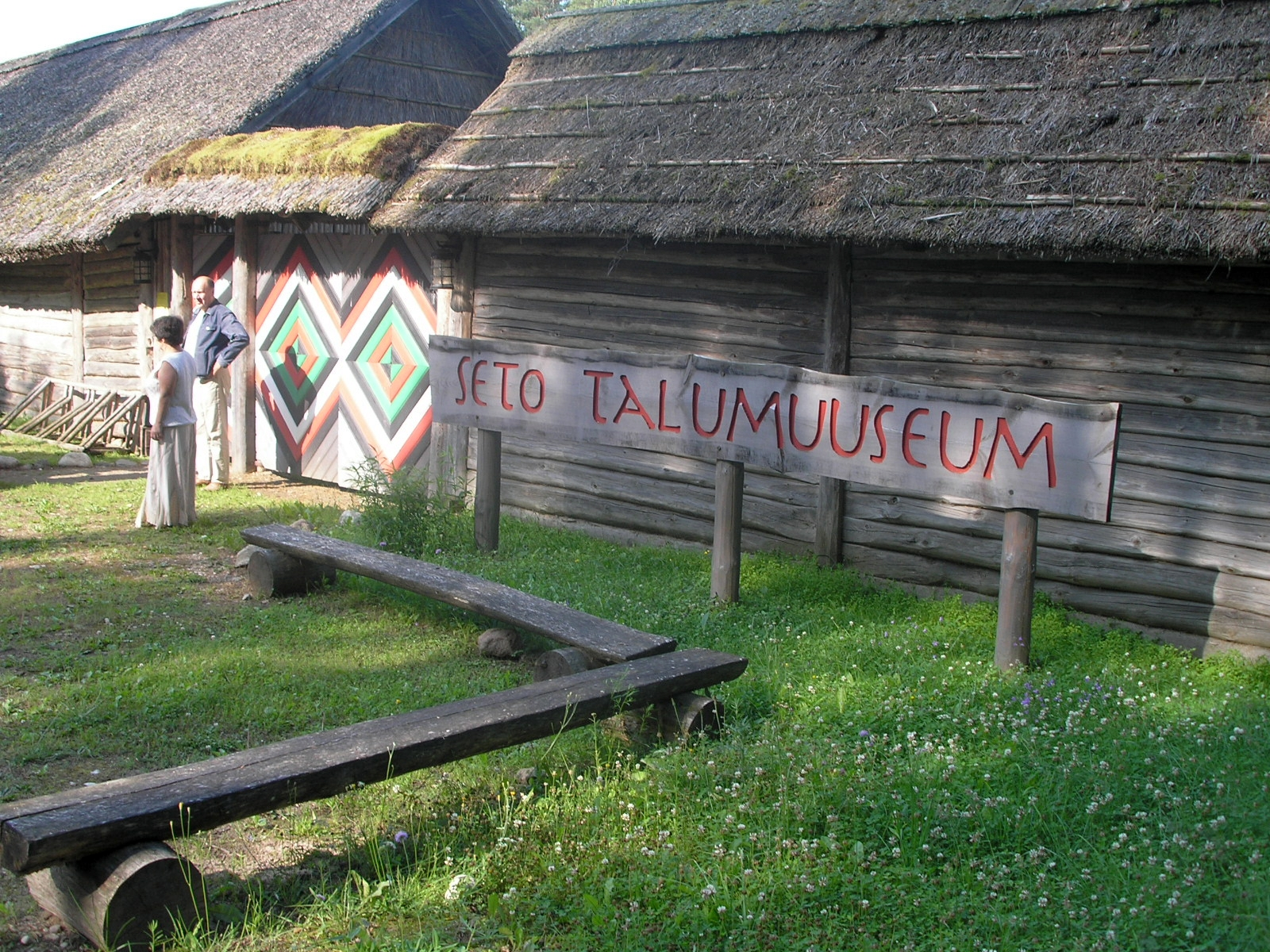
The Seto Museum Gates in 2013

The Seto Museum of Farming is a museum of the Seto people's farming culture and practices, located in the Värska Parish, Põlva County, Estonia. It was first opened in 1998.

== General ==
The museum showcases traditional farm construction, ancient work tools, and craftwork. It also organizes Seto cultural events which present Seto folklore and traditions, such as "Lace days" (Estonian, pitsipäevad) where visitors have the opportunity to watch and help create colorful Seto lacework among other traditions.
