= Jaak Simm =

Estonian linguist (1943–1981)

- Born: July 14, 1943; Tartu, Estonia
- Died: July 14, 1981 (aged 38); Saaremaa, Estonia
- Occupation: Linguist

Jaak Simm (July 14, 1943 – July 14, 1981) was an Estonian linguist.

== Early life and education ==
Jaak Simm was born in Tartu, Estonia, the son of Elmar Simm (1904–1972) and Õie Simm (née Tillmann, 1912–2002). He spent his childhood in Tartu and his school years in Elva. Simm graduated from Tartu State University in 1967 with a degree in Finno-Ugric languages. From 1968 to 1971, he was a graduate student in toponymy. In 1973, he defended his thesis Võnnu kihelkonna asustusalane toponüümika (The Settlement Toponymy of Võnnu Parish) and received the degree candidate of philology.

== Career ==
From 1967 to 1968, Simm taught Estonian at Tartu Secondary School No. 5 and from 1968 at the Institute of Language and Literature of the Academy of Sciences of the Estonian SSR. From 1971 to 1981 he was a junior researcher in the toponymy group, and from 1976 to 1981 a senior researcher in the toponymy group of the dialect section. He was involved in the study of Estonian place names (onomastics), and he collected and studied place names in Tartu County in particular. He published over 100 studies and essays.

He is buried in Pärnamäe Cemetery.
