= Saatse Boot =

Russian territory that extends through an Estonian road

Coordinates: 57.90577°N 27.71323°E

Saatse Boot (Estonia)
Saatse Boot (Baltic states)
Saatse Boot (European Union)

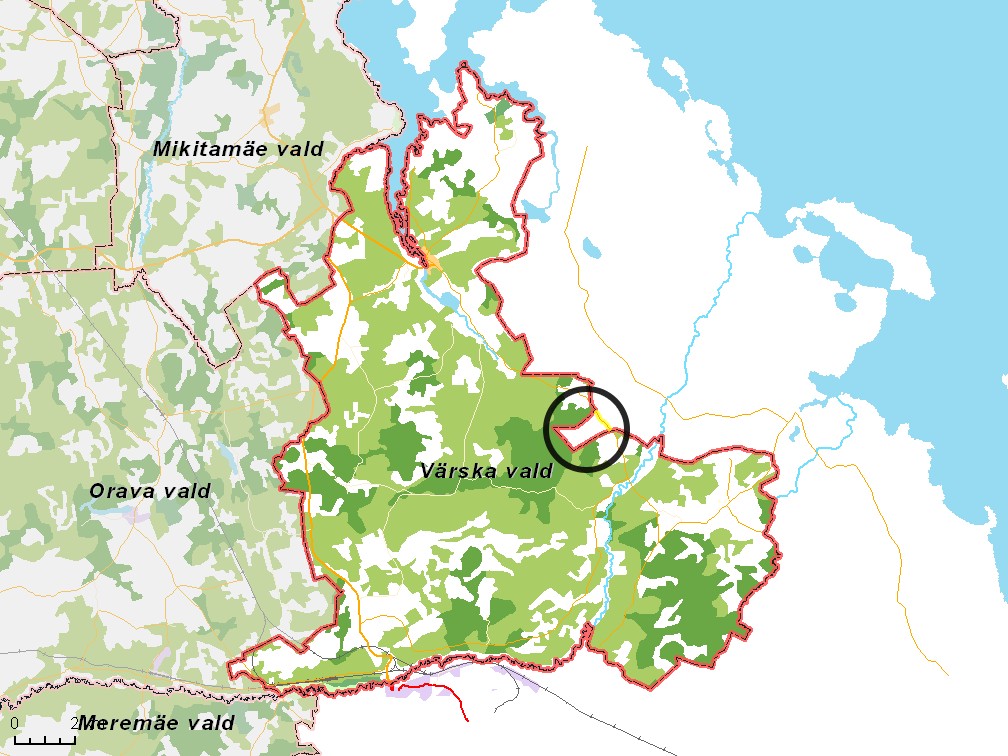
Former Värska Parish, with the Saatse Boot marked by the circle on the northeastern border. The road which crossed through Russia is marked in yellow. In the north-east, Lake Peipus is visible.

The Saatse Boot (Estonian: Saatse saabas; Russian: Саатсеский сапог) is a boot-shaped area of Russian territory of 115 hectares (1.15 km^{2}; 280 acres; 0.44 sq mi) that extends through the road number 178 between the Estonian villages of Lutepää and Sesniki (themselves between the larger settlement Värska and village of Saatse) in Setomaa Parish. For many years, the boot was freely accessible to cross from and to Estonia, until the road was permanently closed by the Estonian Police and Border Guard in 2025.

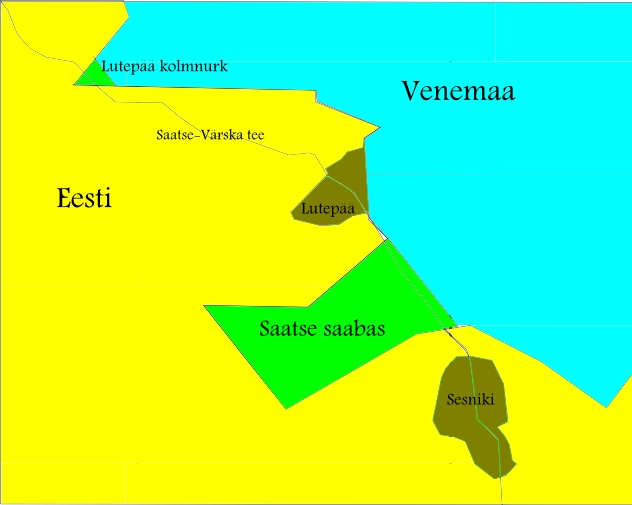
Map of Lutepää Triangle and Saatse Boot.

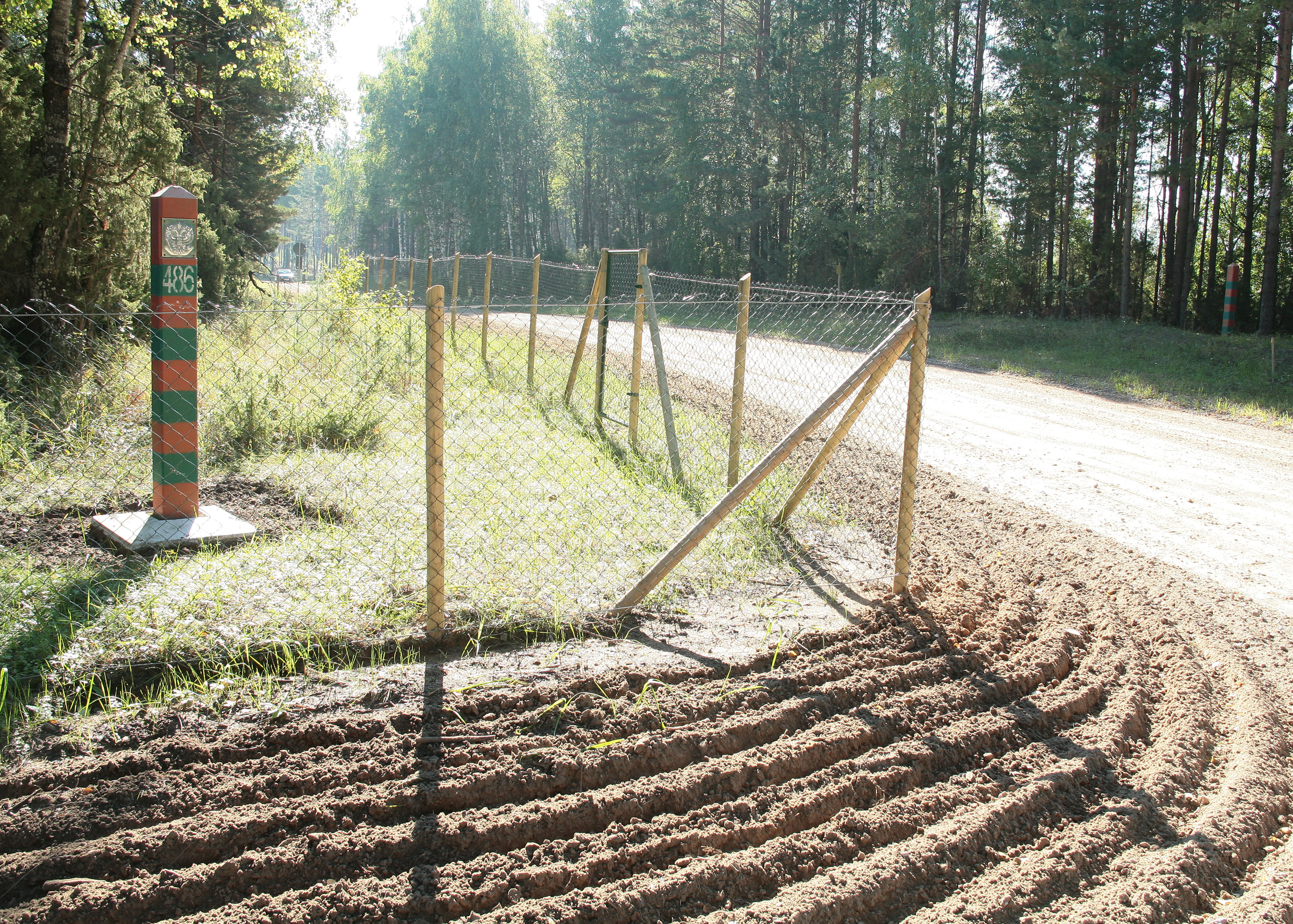
Road 178 crossing the Russian border at Lutepää Triangle (Boundary marker No. 486).

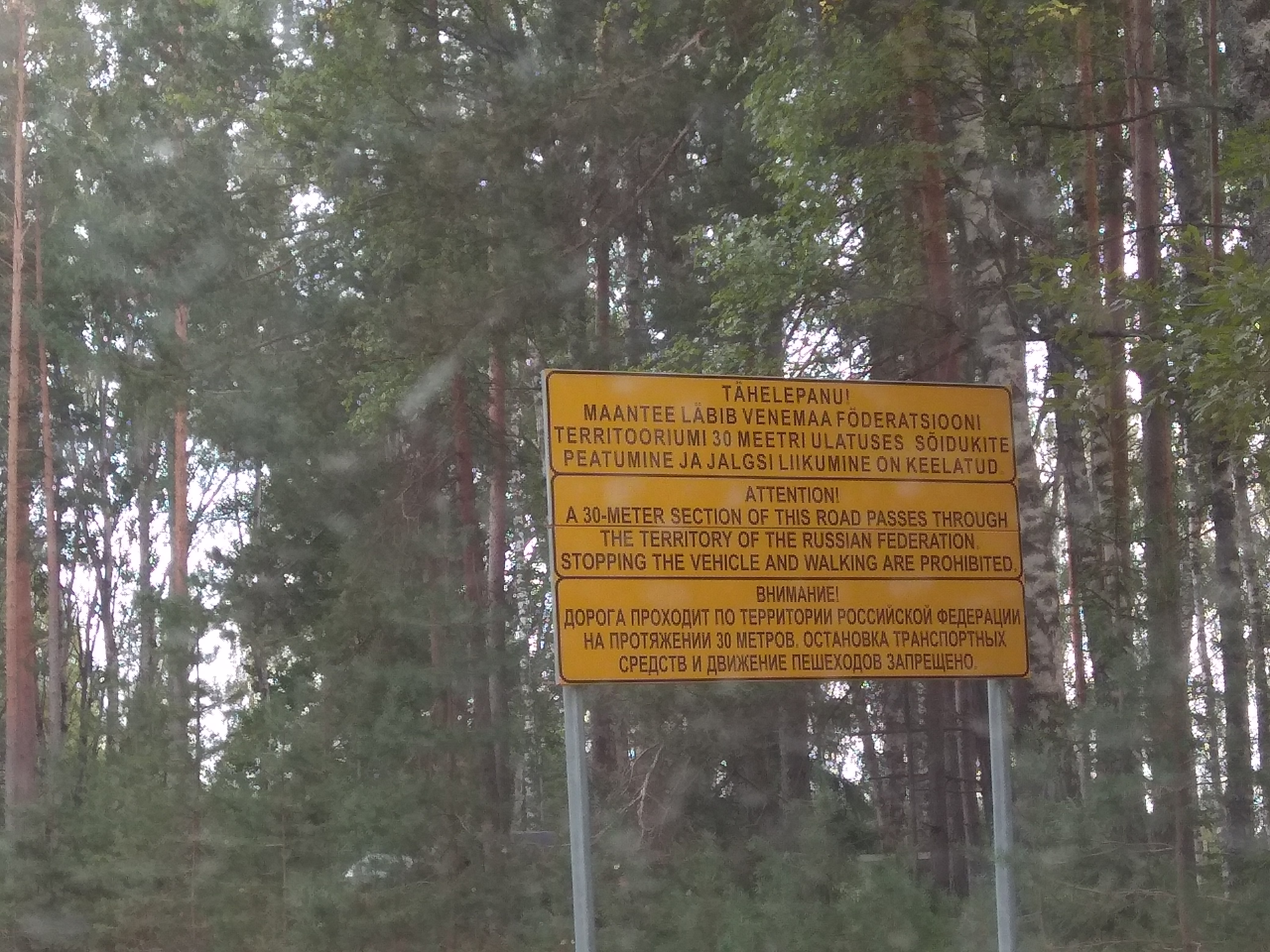
Sign at Lutepää Triangle where it goes through Russian territory. The sign at Saatse Boot is similarly worded.

== Background ==
The current Estonian–Russian border was established in 1944 when about 3,000 km^{2} of Estonian territory was transferred to the Russian Soviet Federative Socialist Republic. Land transfers continued for the next decades. In 1957, the Supreme Soviet of the Soviet Union authorized small exchange of territories in the administrative border area south of Lake Peipus, forming the now Russian semi-exclave of Dubki and the Saatse Boot.

During the Soviet occupation, it was the boundary between two constituent republics of the Soviet Union. Estonia regained independence in 1991 and since then the same border (officially referred to as 'line of control' by Estonia) has been the international border between the two countries. The border is oddly shaped because the land parcel belonged to a farm that was administratively part the village of Gorodishche (until 1944, the village of Linnaste in Estonian Petseri County's Järvesuu Parish) located 1.5 km (0.9 mi) further east. The farmhouse in the boot has been abandoned since Estonia regained independence. Its last owner is said to live in Estonia. He was not allowed to turn off from the road starting and ending in Estonian territory, to the road leading to the farmhouse hundred metres from the road.

== Värska–Saatse Road ==
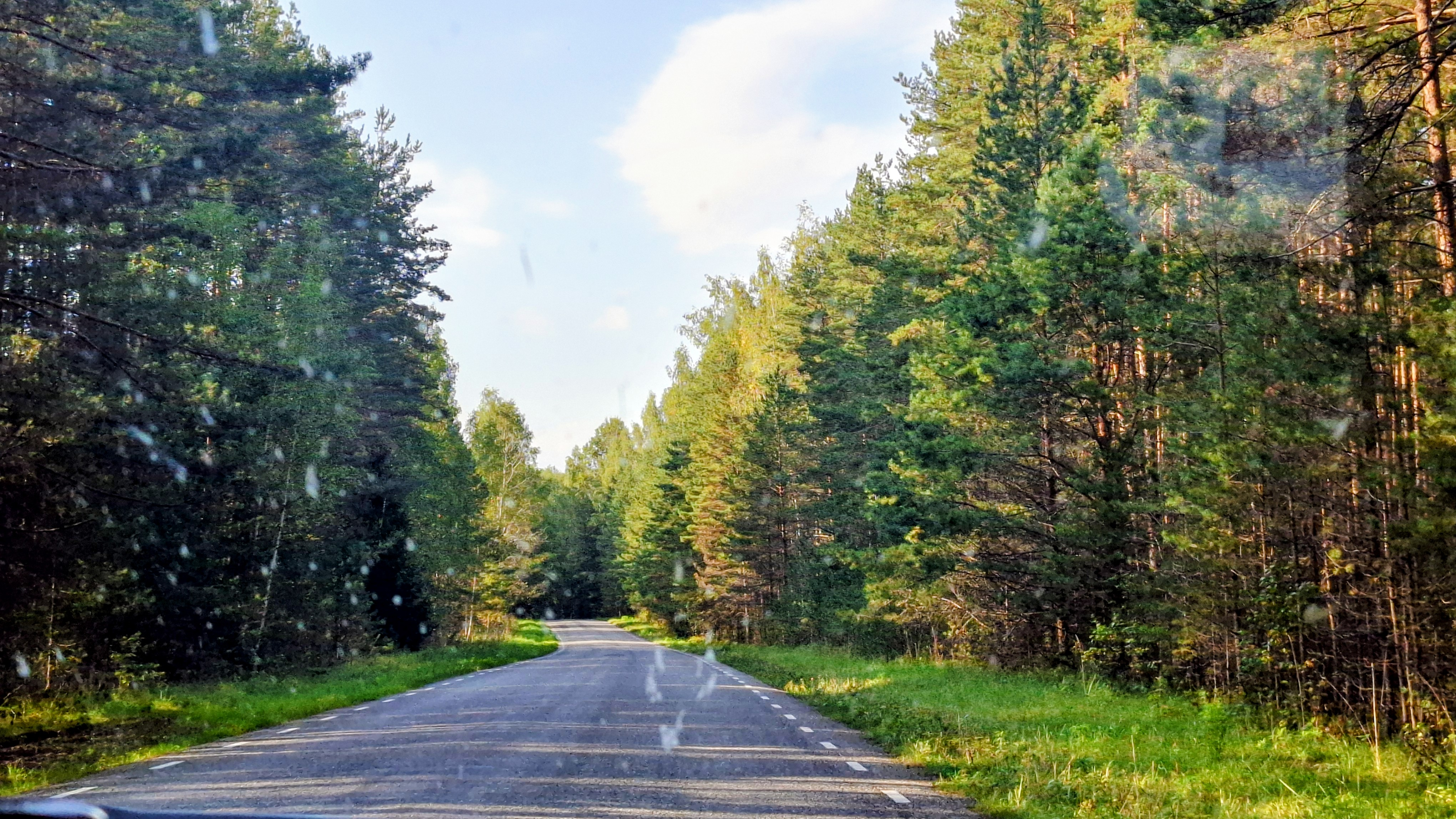
Road through the boot on Russian territory

The road between the settlements of Värska and Saatse went through the Saatse Boot for approximately 1 kilometre (0.62 mi). Until October 2025, motorists and bicyclists from the Estonian side were permitted to pass through the Russian portion without presenting to border control or needing a visa, as long as they did not stop until they re-entered Estonian territory. In the event a vehicle broke down, drivers were advised to remain in their vehicle, contact the Saatse border station and await further instructions. Passing through on foot or exiting the vehicle was forbidden. Warning signs in Estonian, Russian, and English were posted along the road to remind people.

=== Closure and future ===
In 2008, a new road connecting Sesniki to Matsuri opened, making it possible to reach the aforementioned villages without necessarily passing through the 'boot'. This is however a 15 kilometres (9.3 mi) to 20 kilometres (12 mi) detour if going from Värska.

On May 22, 2024, Estonian Interior Minister Lauri Läänemets said Estonia planned to construct a border fence and a new, shorter detour road 4.7 kilometres (2.9 mi) in length around the Saatse Boot plus upgrades on 1.7 kilometres (1.1 mi) of existing roads for a total cost of about €4 million. In early 2025, construction was halted after protected plant species were discovered in the area, forcing the government to conduct an environmental impact assessment.

On 10 October 2025, Estonian authorities temporarily closed the road after increased Russian activity in the region. On the next day Estonian media published images of 7 armed Russians wearing a mix of civilian and military clothing standing in the middle of the road on the Russian side. A day before that a drone coming from Russia had violated Estonian airspace for 18 minutes in southeastern Estonia.

On 16 October 2025, the Estonian government decided to permanently close the Saatse Boot road based on the recommendation of the Police and Border Guard Board. Concrete blocks were placed on the both ends of the roads on the Saatse Boot, closing off the 870 metres (2,850 ft) road section inside the boot. The same was done with the 27 metres (89 ft) long Lutepää Triangle road section.

In the interest of national security, it was also decided to forgo the environmental study in order to speed up construction of the new road, which was originally due to be completed following all planning, regulatory and procurement legal requirements in 2 years in autumn 2027. With accelerating certain steps in the process it was estimated the project can be finished a year earlier and with skipping further procedures the road can be built by early 2026.

The construction of permanent border infrastructure was announced to begin immediately. Ninety metre temporary gravel by-pass of the Lutepää Triangle was finished 5 days later on 21 October. The new permanent route will be 300–400 metres (980–1,310 ft) long, with land acquisition required.

Beside the longer Saatse Boot by-pass there is also a shorter route along a forest road which was widened for this purpose.

=== Proposed border swap ===
In the 2000s and 2010s, there were proposals to straighten out the boot to remove the border oddity. In one such proposal, the area of the boot was to be transferred to Estonia in exchange for two patches of land in Värska and Meremäe Parishes. A treaty was signed in 2005 by the foreign ministers of Estonia and Russia, and again in 2014 after renegotiations, but the agreements were never ratified. On May 22, 2024, Estonian Interior Minister Lauri Läänemets ruled out any land swaps with Russia for now.

=== Incidents ===
Despite the warning signs, people occasionally violated rules. Some tourists were caught getting out of their cars within the Boot to take photos of the Russian border posts, some of them not realising that in doing so they had already violated the rules. In 2017, according to the Estonian Police and Border Guard Board, ten violations were noted and one person was detained in the Boot.

== See also ==
- Enclave and exclave
- Estonia–Russia border
- Estonian–Russian territorial dispute
