= Matsuri, Estonia =

Village in Estonia

Matsuri
- village
- Location in Estonia
- Coordinates: 57°50′53″N 27°34′50″E
- Country: Estonia
- County: Võru County
- Municipality: Setomaa Parish

Population (01.01.2011)
  - Total: 42

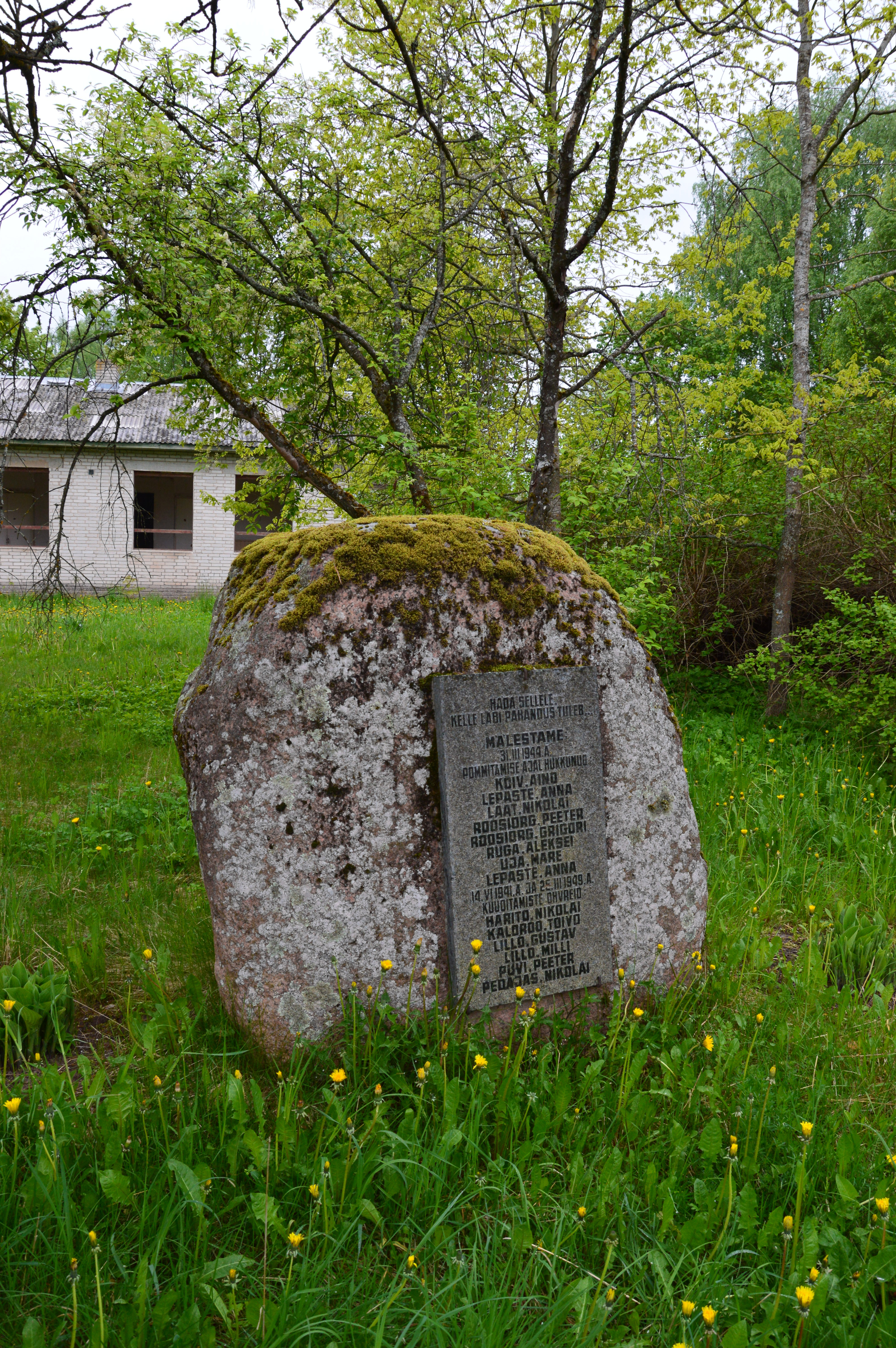
Memorial stone in the village of Matsuri for those who perished in the 1944 bombing raid and the 1941 and 1949 deportations

Matsuri (also known as Matsurdi, Matšuri, Belohvostovo and Piiroja) is a village in Setomaa Parish, Võru County, in southeastern Estonia, on the border with Russia. The Tartu–Pechory, Valga–Pechory railways and Karisilla–Pechory road (nr. 63) all pass Matsuri and cross the border in neighbouring Koidula. In 2011, a new Koidula railway station was built on the territory of Matsuri to enable traffic between Tartu–Pechory and Valga–Pechory railways while avoiding crossing the Russian border. Prior to the 2017 administrative reform of local governments, it was located in Värska Parish.

Matsuri has a population of 42 (as of 1 January 2011).

In 2008 a new Matsuri–Sesniki road was opened, making it possible to reach Saatse and its neighbouring villages without passing through the Saatse Boot.
