= Värska =

Borough in Estonia

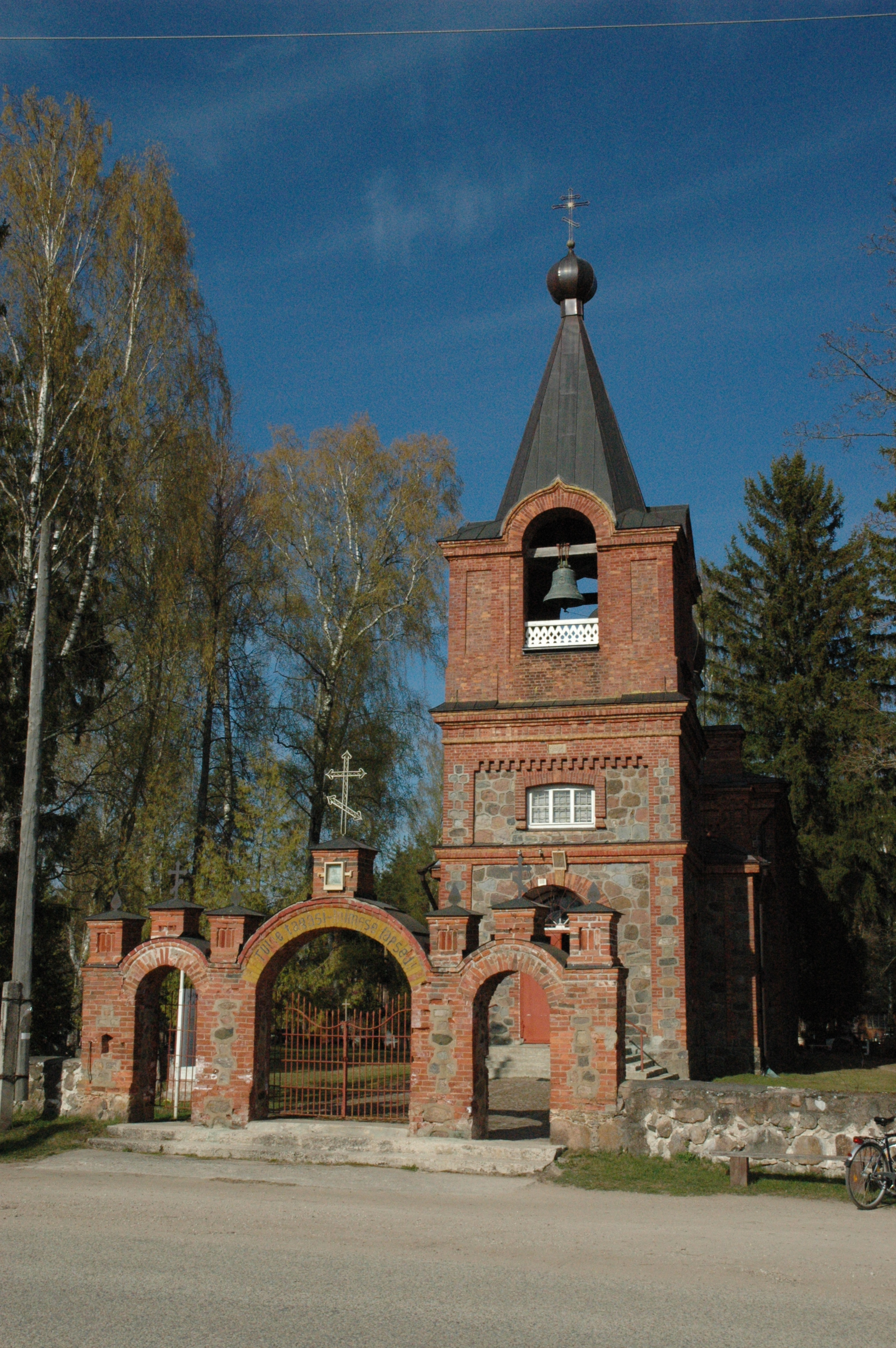
- Church of Värska

- Location within Estonia
- Coordinates: 57°57′29″N 27°38′17″E
- Country: Estonia
- County: Võru County
- Parish: Setomaa Parish

Area
  - Total: 4.6 km^{2} (1.8 sq mi)

Population (2021)
  - Total: 414
  - Density: 90/km^{2} (230/sq mi)
- Time zone: UTC+2 (EET)
  - Summer (DST): UTC+3 (EEST)
- Postal code: 64001

Värska (Seto: Verska) is a small borough (alevik) in Setomaa Parish, Võru County in southeastern Estonia. At the 2021 Census, the settlement's population was 414. It is the most populous village of the Parish. It is famous due to its bottled mineral water known as Värska Vesi.

== History ==
Värska was first mentioned in written sources in 1585. Värska is the birthplace of the poet Paul Haavaoks (1924–1983).

== Geography ==
Värska is located in the east of Võru County, near the border with Russia, 70 km southeast of Tartu. The town stands on the Gulf of Värska, part of Lake Pihkva.

== Landmarks ==
The parish is associated with the Seto Museum of Farming, which opened in 1998. Also located in southern Värska in the village of Verhulitsa is the holy tree Verhulitsa Laudsi Pettäi.

== See also ==
- Saatse Boot
