= Kuigõ Chapel =

Chapel in Setomaa, Estonia

- Kuigõ tsässon
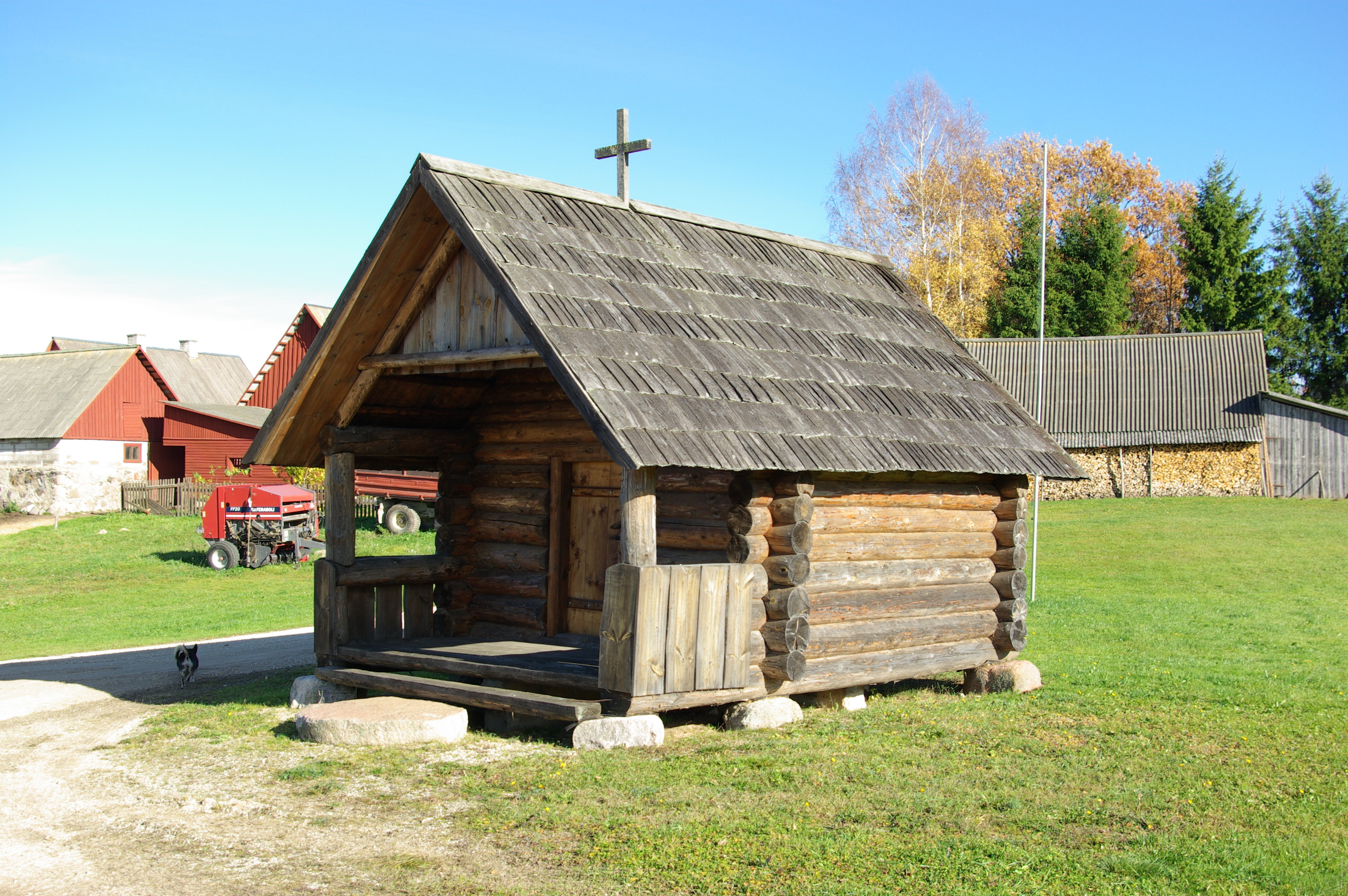

Religion
- Affiliation: Estonian Apostolic Orthodox Church
- Year consecrated: 2007

Location
- Location: Kuigõ, Setomaa Parish, Estonia
- Interactive map of Kuigõ Chapel
- Coordinates: 57°43′26.06″N 27°28′32.03″E

Architecture
- Materials: wood

Kuigõ Chapel (Estonian: Kuigõ tsässon) is a small Seto chapel (Seto: tsässon) in the village of Kuigõ, Setomaa Parish, Võru County in southeastern Estonia. The chapel is located about a hundred metres west of the road from Meremäe to Kuigõ, near the farm of Leo Tamm.

== General information ==
Kuigõ Chapel is a Whitsunday chapel. Whitsunday is a movable feast. The chapel is still used and in good condition. It was inaugurated during Whitsunday of 2008.

== Building data ==
Kuigo Chapel is built from rough hewn pine beams from the outside as well as on the inside. The building has an open shelter, the sides of which have an 80 cm high barrier. It is made from upright unedged boards and fitted by a few centimetre gaps. Fence boards are attached to long protruding wall beams. The outer measurements for the beam part of chapel without corner cross-beams are 350 x 486 centimetres, of which the entrance-room makes up 136 cm. The entrance-room does not have a ceiling. The gables are made from boards with the edges placed on top of each other, stretching up to collar beams. Kuigo Chapel stands on granite stones. The height of the building up to the roof ridge is 350 cm. The roof has a double shingle cover and there is a simple saw timber cross on the ridge. Another wooden cross is attached to the beams above the door. There is a door made from wide boards in the front wall that opens on the inside and a window in the northern side wall with four squares (h 50 x w 40 cm).

== Furnishing ==
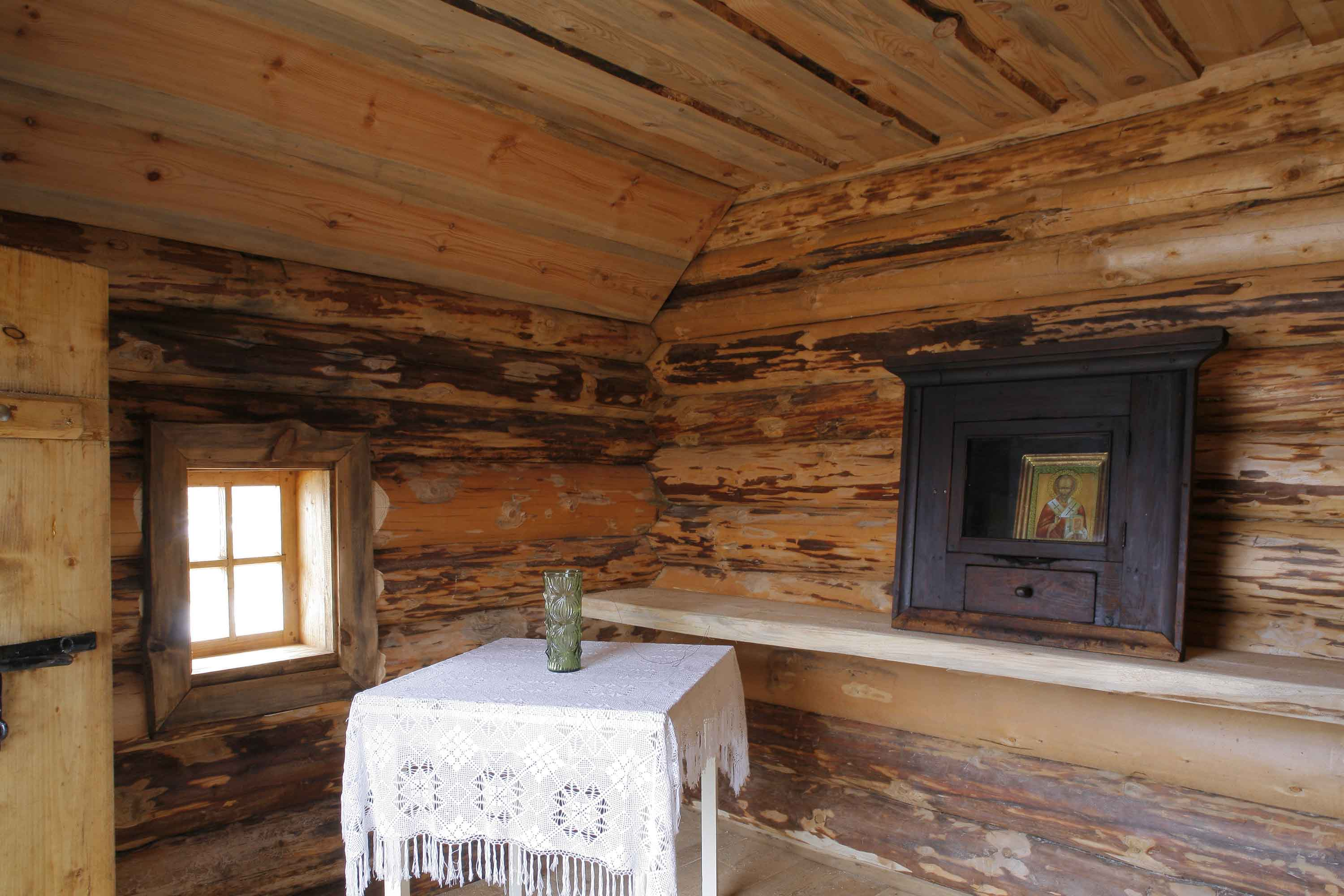
Interior view of Kuigõ Chapel in 2008

The chapel is furnished traditionally: there is an icon table in the rear wall covered by a white towel. Most of the icons are attached on the rear wall and there is a carved icon case (kibot) with a glass door on the icon table. Icon depicting Mother of God is fixed on the wall and covered by a knitted woollen red-patterned icon scarf (pühaserätt). Other icons are covered by two icon scarves painted on dark fabric and one newer knitted icon scarf. There are embroidered and crocheted tea towels and a few icons on the side walls. There is a smallish metal oil lamp hanging in front of the right-hand angled icon and a candle-holder made from a gnarled tree-trunk. An analogion (analoi) stands in the middle of the chapel, a table in one wall and a long bench in the other wall. The floor is covered by rag carpets. The ceiling of the chapel is made from unedged boards that are fitted with the edges placed on top of each other. The floor is made from wide planks. There is no extra finishing on the floors-ceilings and inner walls.
