= Choir (architecture) =

Area of a church or cathedral

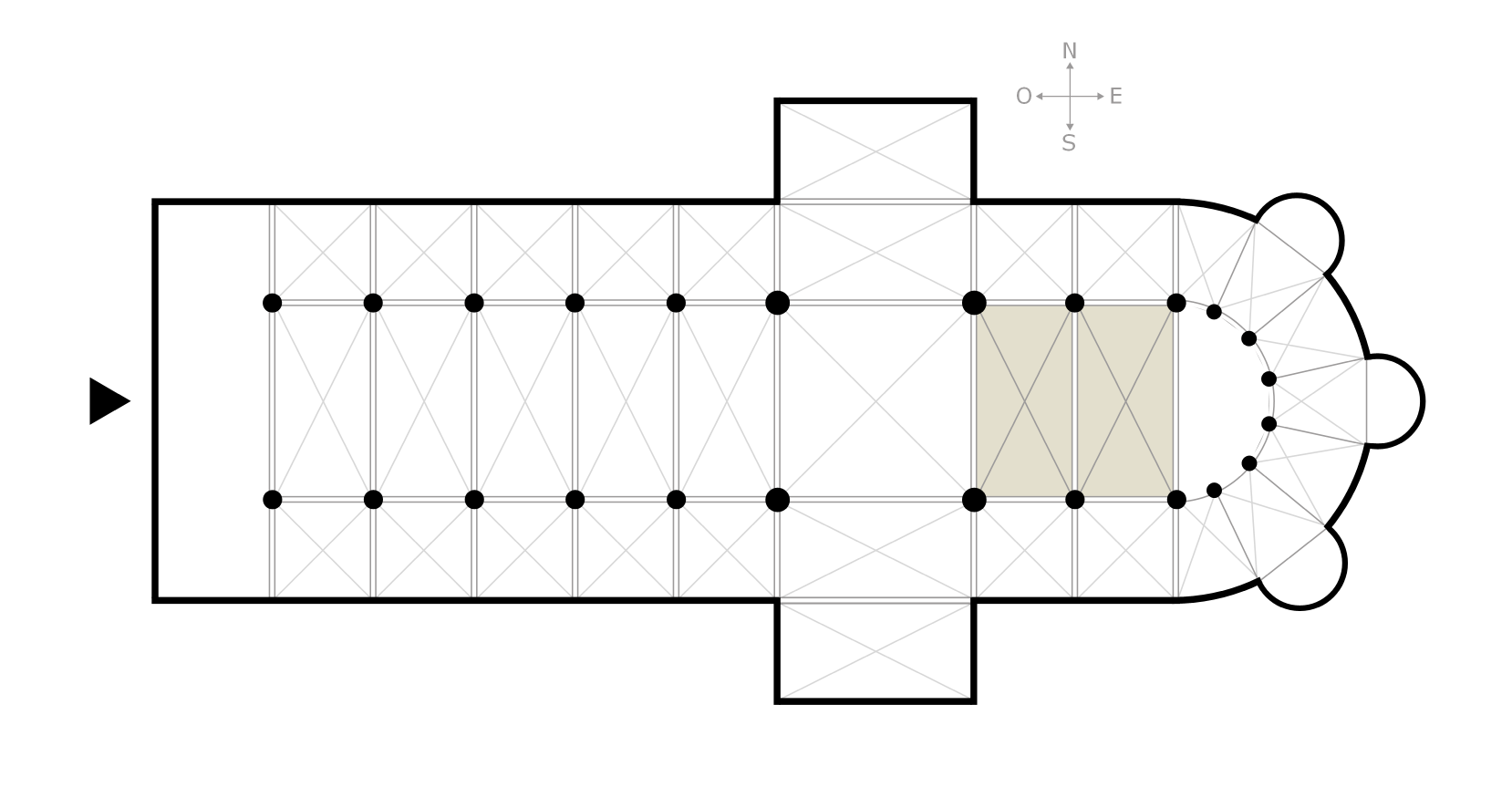
The placement of the choir within a large Latin cross church

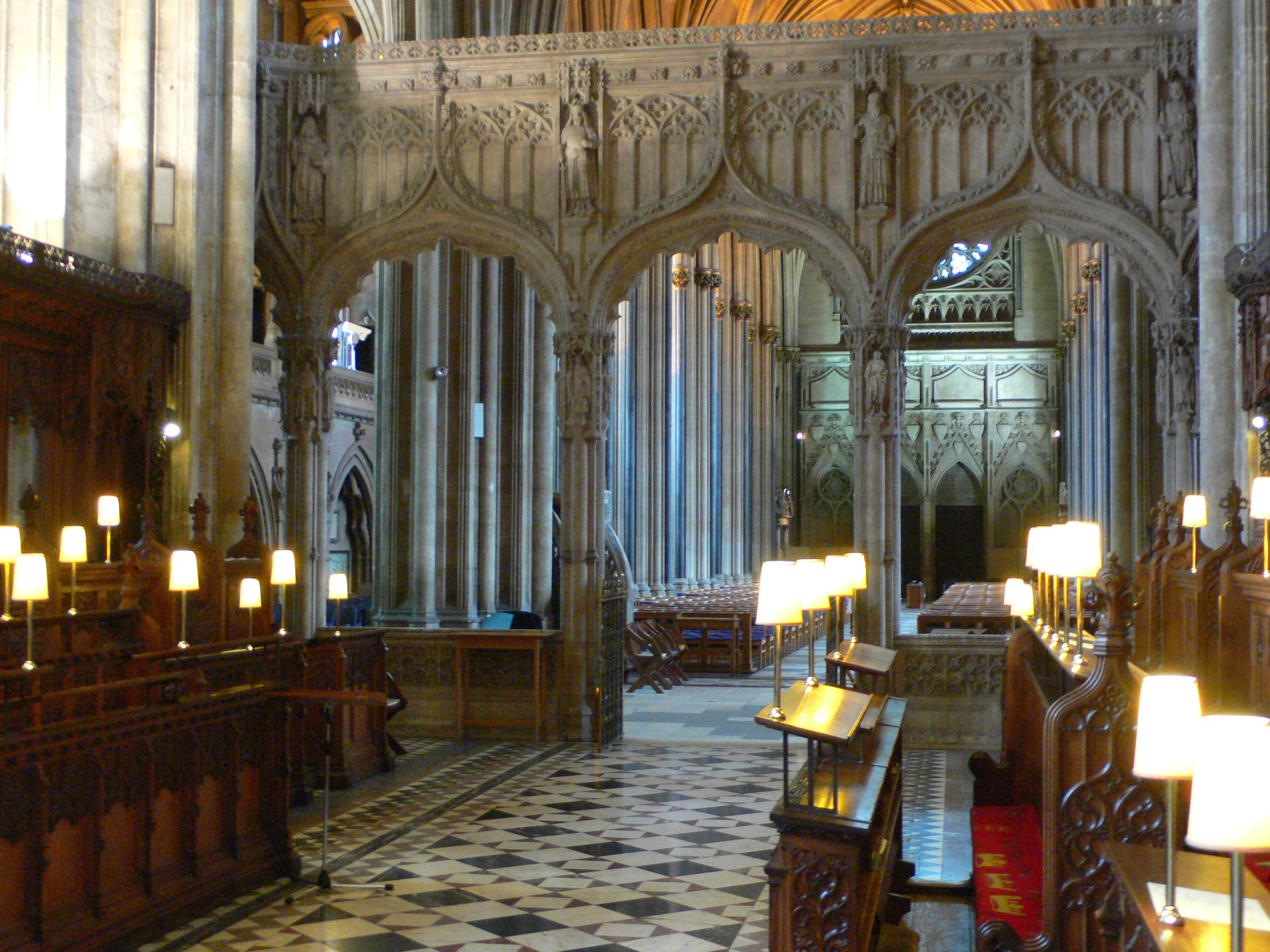
The choir of Bristol Cathedral, with the nave seen through the chancel screen, so looking west

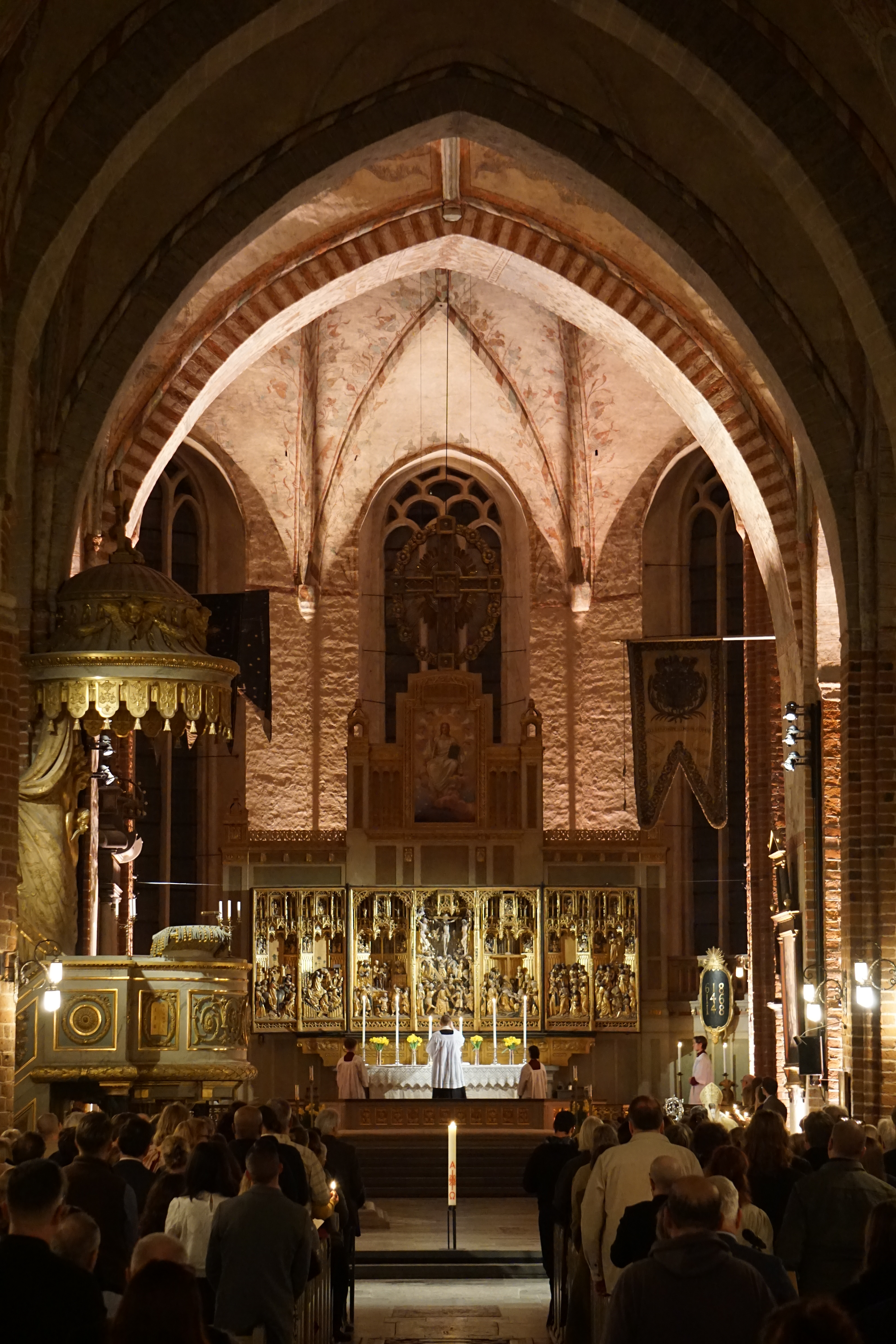
The eastwards-facing choir of Strängnäs Cathedral, Sweden, during the Easter Vigil.

A choir, also sometimes called quire, is the area of a church or cathedral that provides seating for the clergy and church choir. It is in the western part of the chancel, between the nave and the sanctuary, which houses the altar and Church tabernacle. In larger medieval churches it contained choir-stalls, seating aligned with the side of the church, so at right-angles to the seating for the congregation in the nave. Smaller medieval churches may not have a choir in the architectural sense at all, and they are often lacking in churches built by all denominations after the Protestant Reformation, though the Gothic Revival revived them as a distinct feature.

As an architectural term "choir" remains distinct from the actual location of any singing choir – these may be located in various places, and often sing from a choir-loft, often over the door at the liturgical western end. In modern churches, the choir may be located centrally behind the altar, or the pulpit. The place where the singers are based is sometimes called the ritual choir, as opposed to the architectural choir or constructional choir.

The back-choir or retroquire is a space behind the high altar in the choir of a church, in which there may be a small altar standing back to back with the other.

== History ==
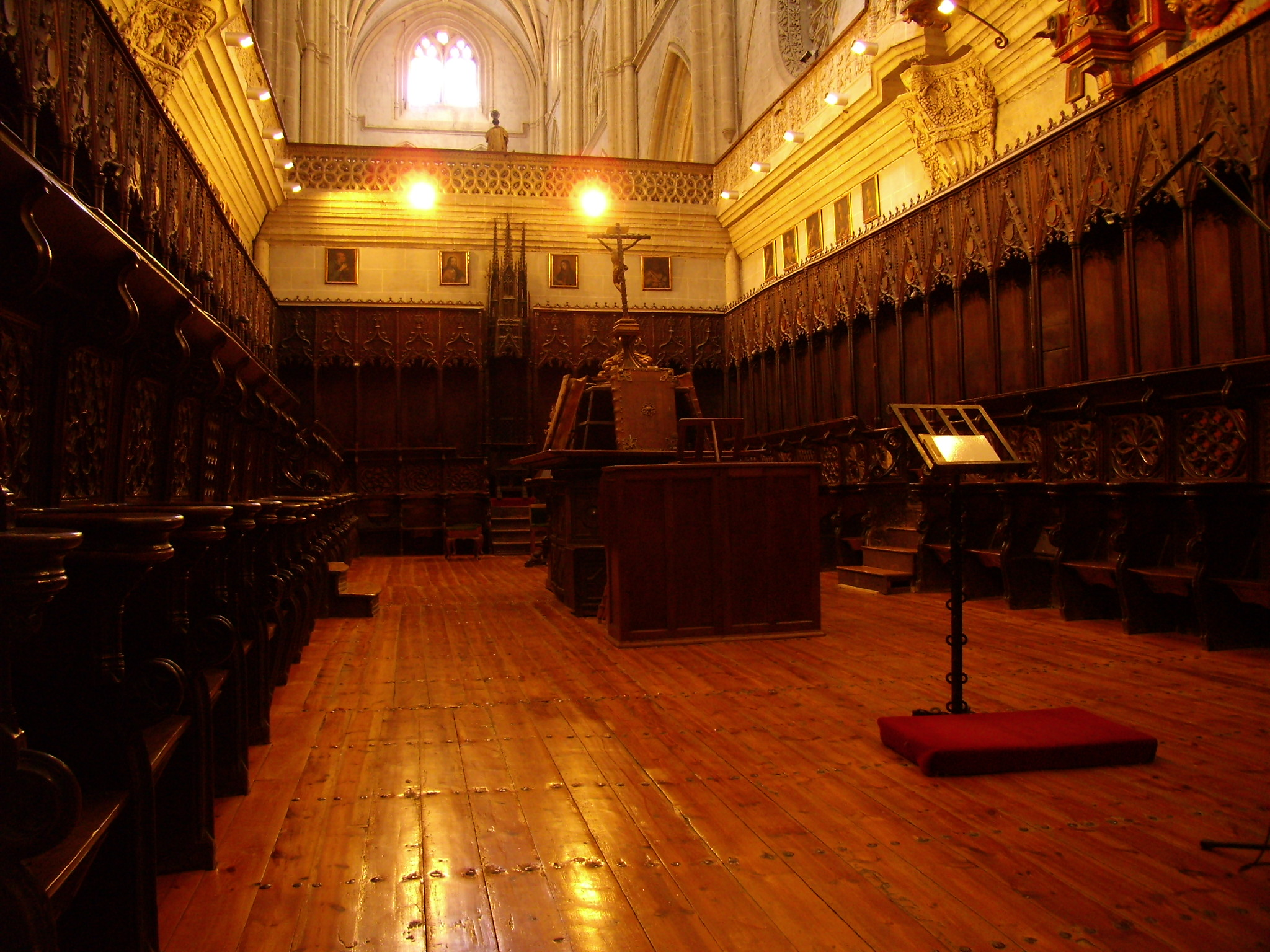
The Quire in Palencia Cathedral in northern Spain, an example of a monastic quire

In the Early Church, the sanctuary was connected directly to the nave. The choir was simply the east part of the nave, and was fenced off by a screen or low railing, called cancelli, which is where the English word chancel comes from. The development of the architectural feature known as the choir is the result of the liturgical development brought about by the end of persecutions under Constantine the Great and the rise of monasticism. The word "choir" is first used by members of the Latin Church. Isidore of Seville and Honorius of Autun write that the term is derived from the "corona", the circle of clergy or singers who surrounded the altar.

When first introduced, the choir was attached to the bema, the elevated platform in the centre of the nave on which were placed seats for the clergy and a lectern for scripture readings. This arrangement can still be observed at the San Clemente al Laterano in Rome. Over time, the bema (or presbytery) and choir moved eastward to their current position. In some churches, such as Westminster Cathedral, the choir is arranged in the apse behind the altar.

The architectural details of the choir developed in response to its function as the place where the Divine Office was chanted by the monastic brotherhood or the chapter of canons. The chancel was regarded as the clergy's part of the church, and any choirboys from a choir school counted as part of the clergy for this purpose. After the Reformation, when the number of clergy present even in large churches and cathedrals tended to reduce, and lay singing choirs became more frequent, there were often objections to placing them in the traditional choir stalls in the chancel. The pulpit and lectern are also usually found at the front of the choir, though both Catholic and Protestant churches have sometimes moved the pulpit to the nave for better audibility. The organ may be located here, or in a loft elsewhere in the church. Some cathedrals have a retro-choir behind the high altar, opening eastward towards the chapels (chantries) in the eastern extremity.

The Reformed Churches (inclusive of the Continental Reformed, Anglican, and Presbyterian denominations) generally moved the communion table forward, typically to the front of the chancel, and often used lay choirs who were placed in a gallery at the west end. The rear of deep chancels became little used in churches surviving from the Middle Ages, and new churches very often omitted one. With the emphasis on sermons, and their audibility, some churches simply converted their chancels to seat part of the congregation. In 19th-century England one of the battles of the Cambridge Camden Society, the architectural wing of the Anglo-Catholics in the Church of England, was to restore the chancel, including the choir, as a necessary part of a church. By pushing the altar back to its medieval position and having the choir used by a lay choir, they were largely successful in this, although the harder end of the High Church objected to allowing a large group of laity into the chancel. Different approaches to worship in the 20th century again tended to push altars in larger churches forward, to be closer to the congregation, and the chancel again risks being a less used area of the church. A number of Evangelical-Lutheran churches retained the traditional position of the altar against the eastern wall. Chancels remain an integral part of Evangelical-Lutheran and Roman Catholic churches, though chancel rails have become less common in Roman Catholic churches since the Second Vatican Council (though Evangelical-Lutheran churches have retained the chancel rail).

== Seating ==
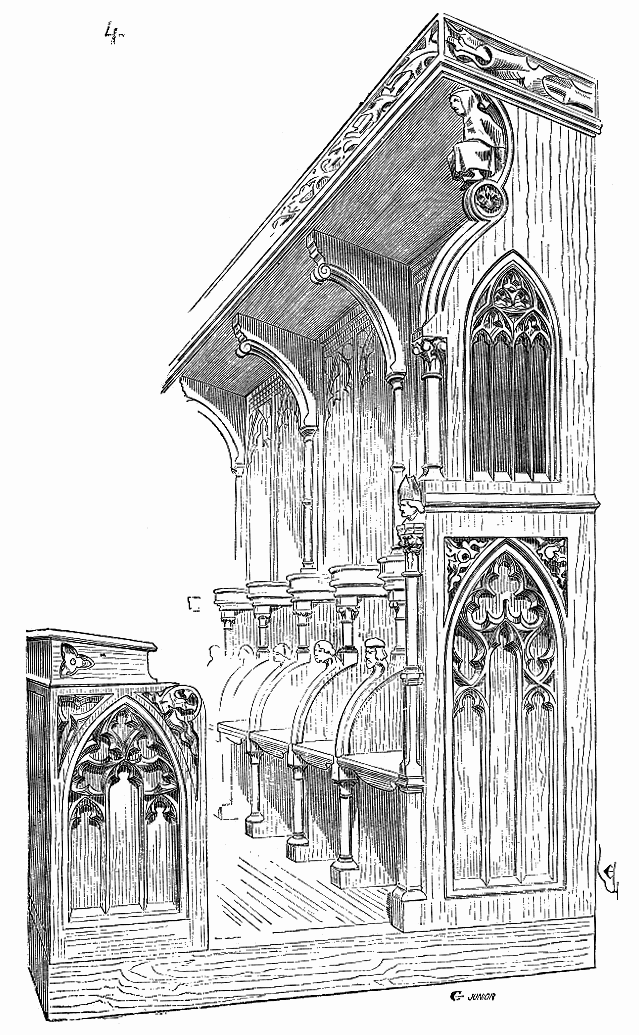
Illustration showing monk's stalls at Anellau, France, 14th century

The choir area is occupied by sometimes finely carved and decorated wooden seats known as choir stalls, where clergy or other churchgoers sit, stand and kneel during services. The choir may be furnished either with long benches (pews) or individual choir stalls. There may be several rows of seating, typically running parallel to the longest walls of the church.

The use of choir stalls (as opposed to benches) is more traditional in monasteries and collegiate churches. Monastic choir stalls are often fitted with seats that fold up when the monastics stand and fold down when they sit. Often the hinged seat will have a misericord (small wooden seat) on the underside on which a person can lean while standing during the long services. The upper part of the monk's stall is so shaped as to provide a headrest while sitting, and arm rests when standing. Monasteries, like most churches, will often have strict rules as to when monks should sit and when they must stand during services.

Choir benches are more common in parish churches. Each bench may have padded kneelers attached to the back of it so that the person behind may kneel at the appropriate times during services. The front row will often have a long prie-dieu running in front of it for those seated there to place their books on; these may also be fitted with kneelers.

In a cathedral, the bishop's throne or cathedra is usually located in this space.

== Image gallery ==
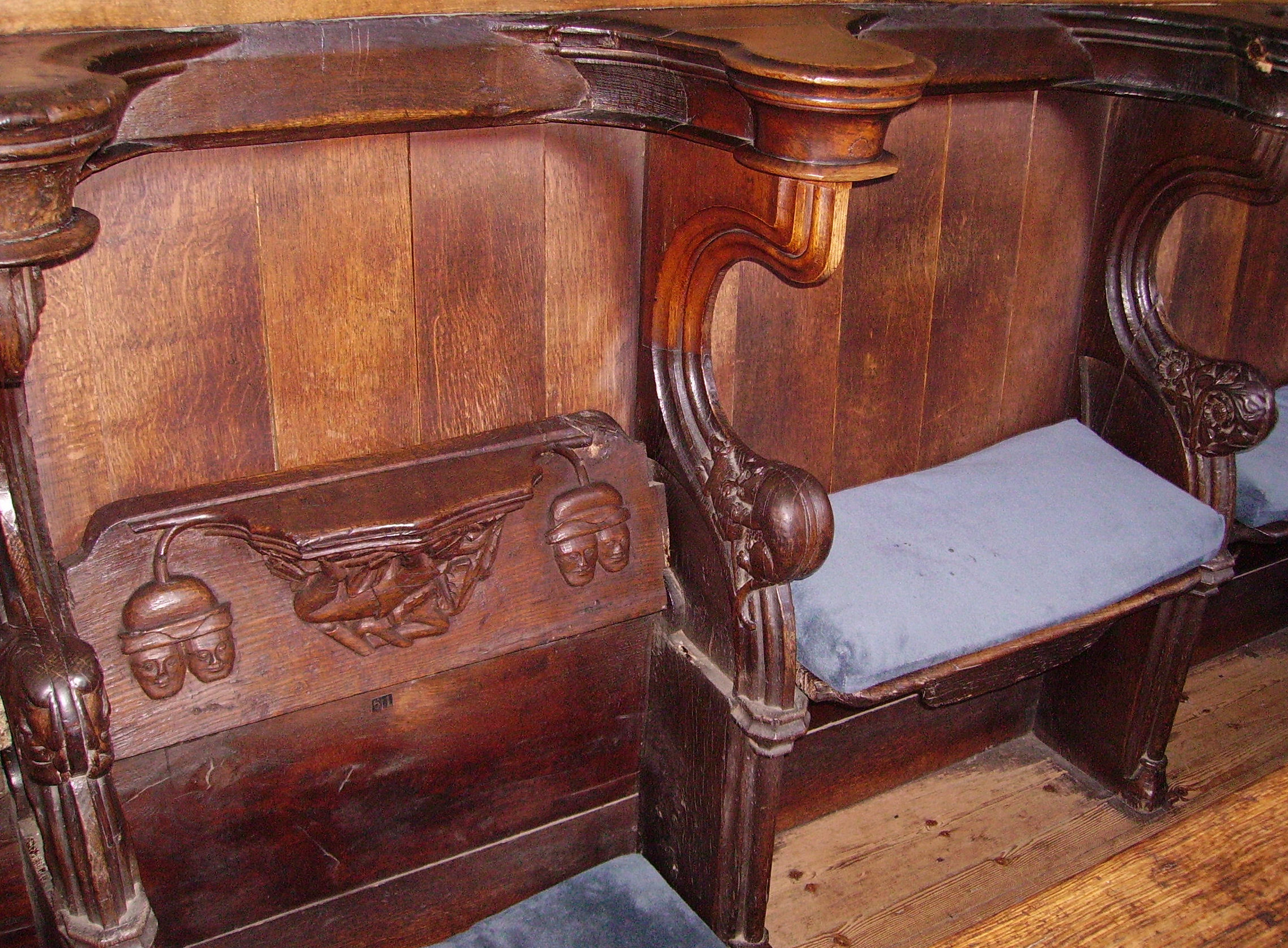
Choir stalls at Boston Stump, Lincolnshire. A seat has been lifted to reveal the misericord.

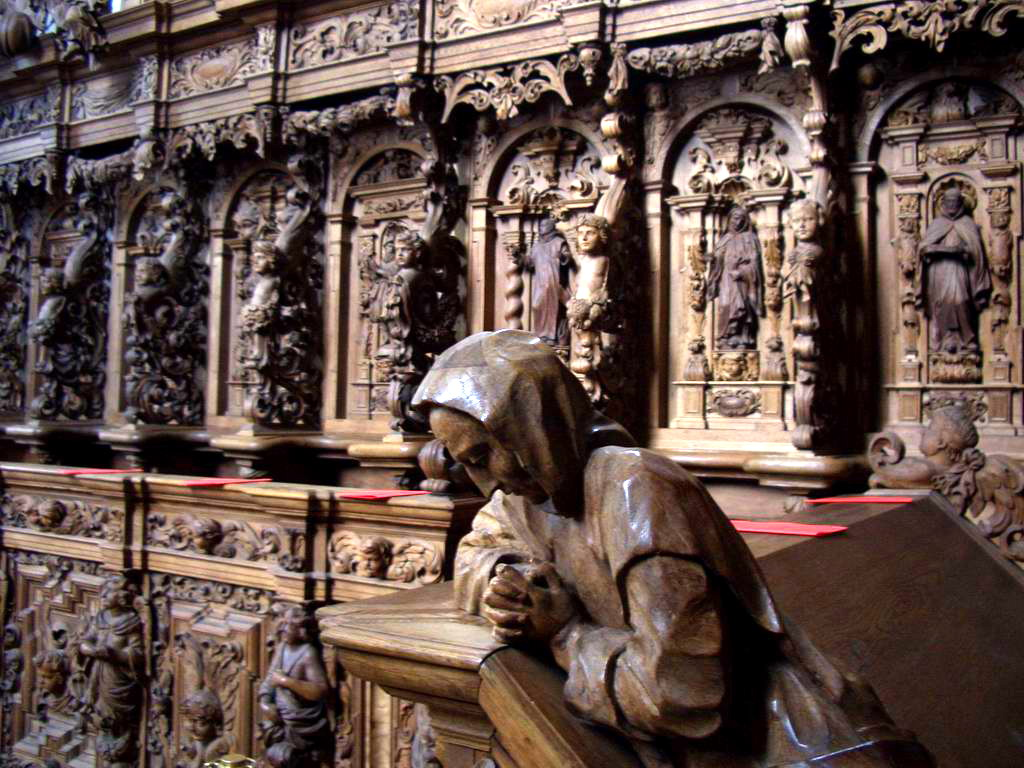
Elaborately carved choir stalls at Buxheim Charterhouse in Bavaria, by Ignaz Waibl

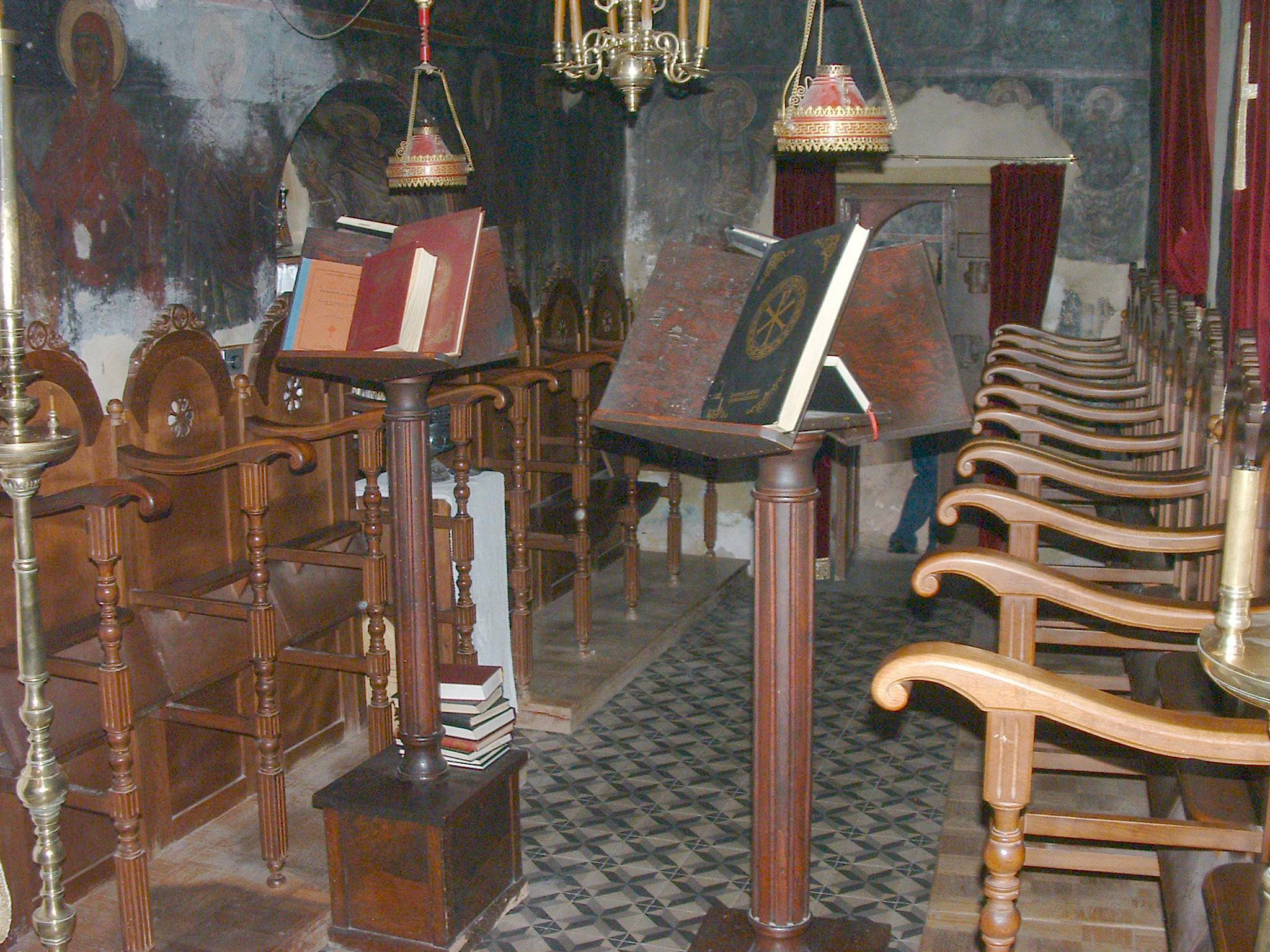
Eastern Orthodox choir stalls (kathisma) on the kliros (area for the choir) with analogia (lecterns) for liturgical books

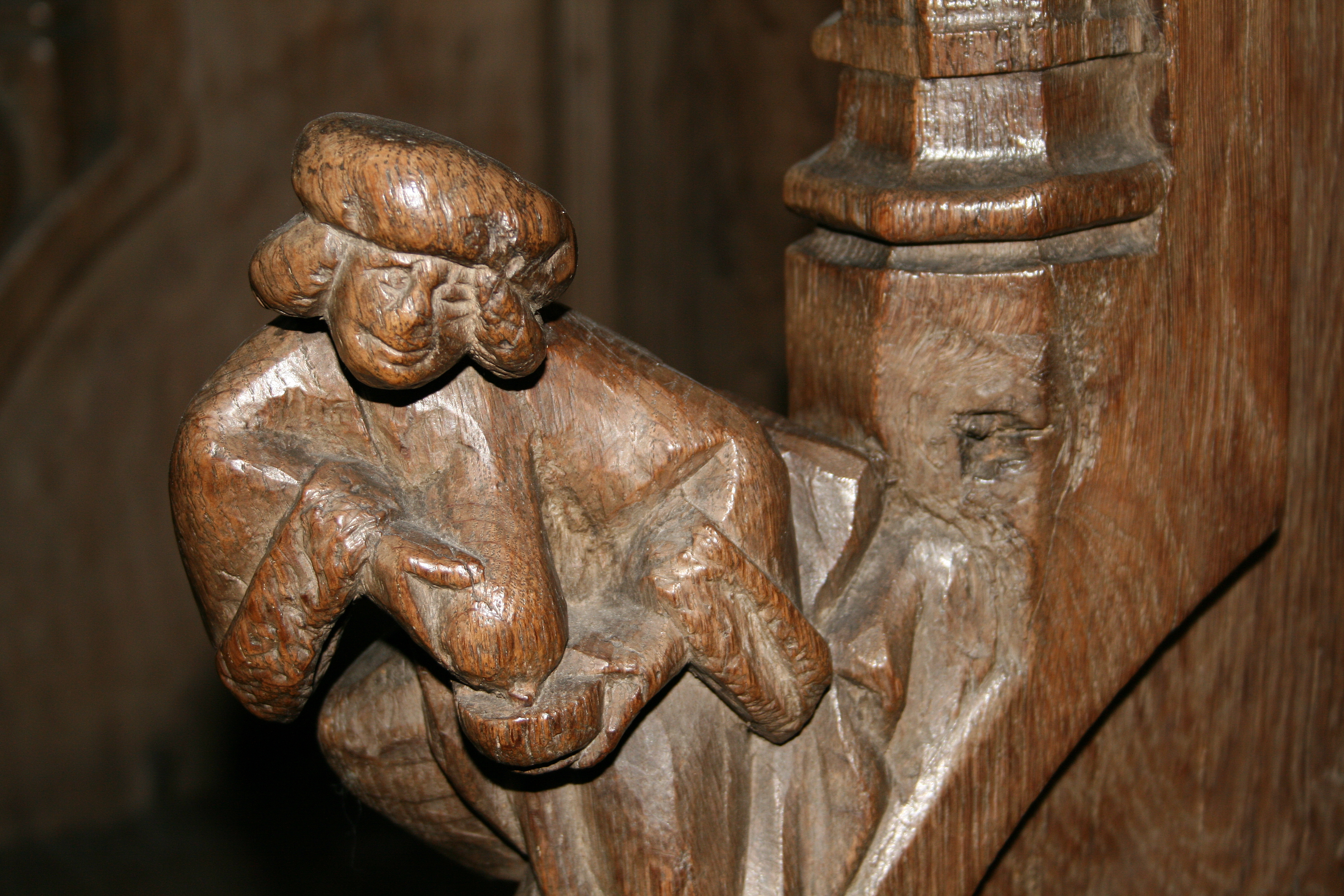
Statuette of a wet nurse forming part of a parclose screen in the Basilica of Saint Maternus, Walcourt, Belgium

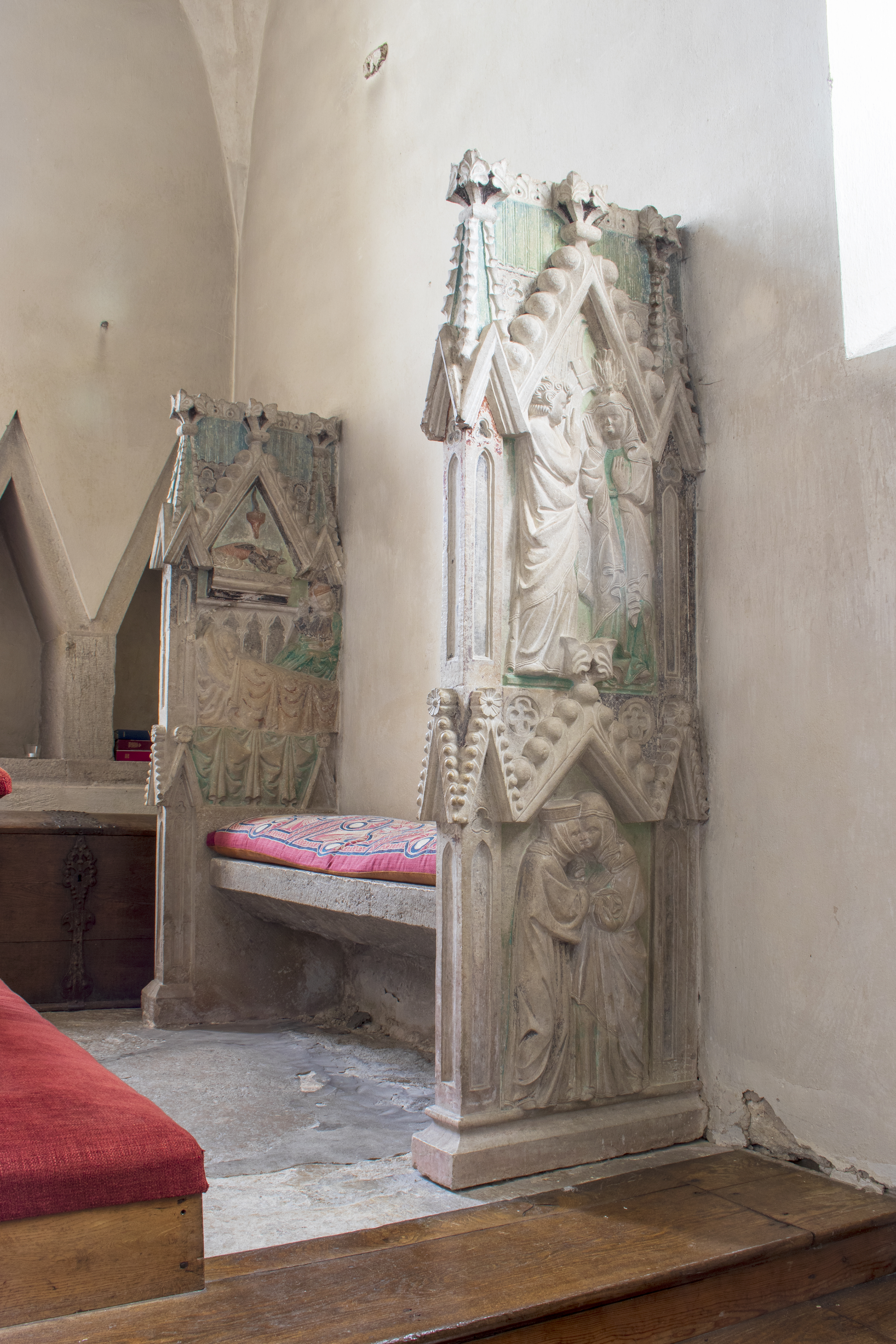
Choir bench made of limestone with still-visible traces of medieval paint, Burs Church, Gotland, Sweden

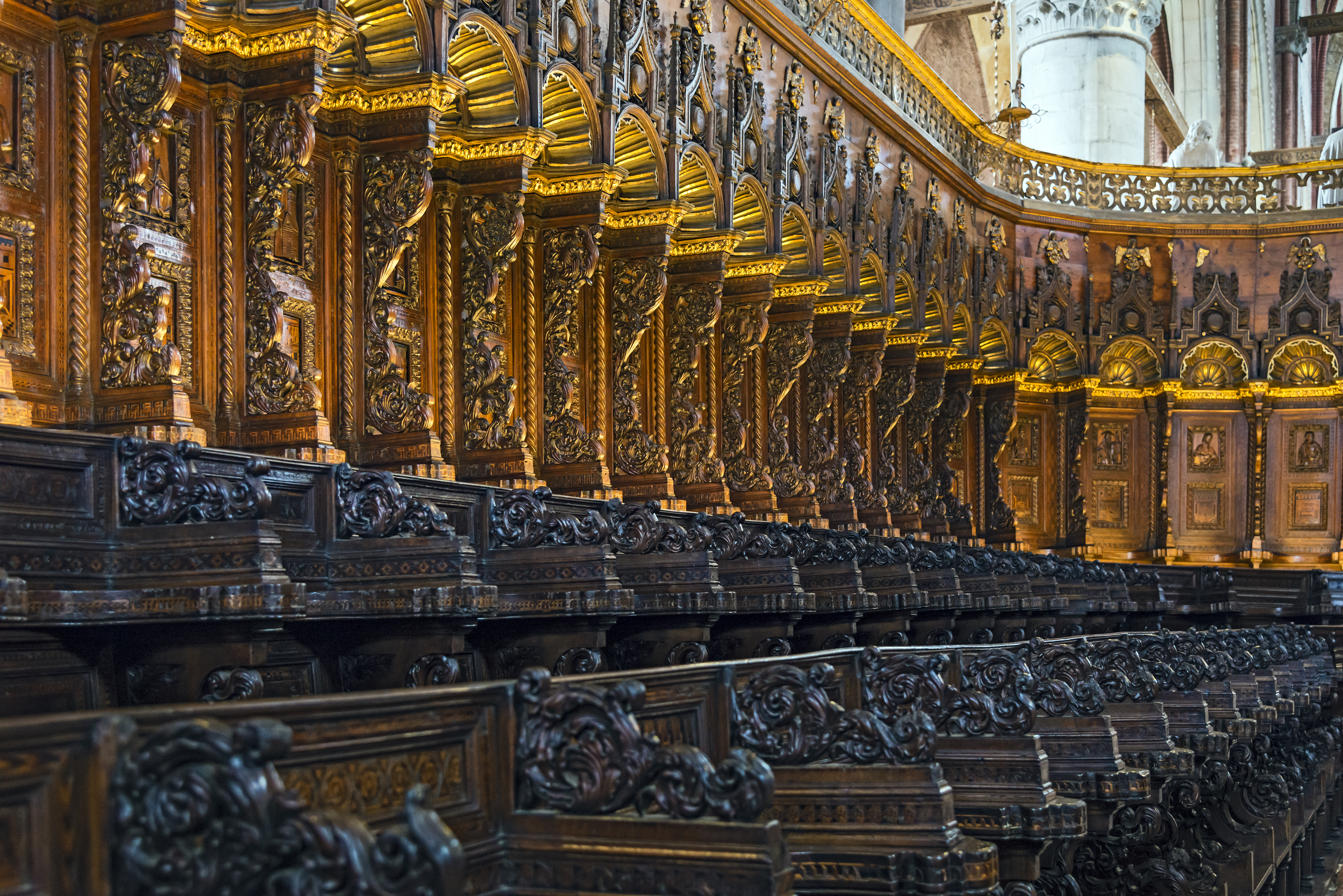
Choir bench of Santa Maria Gloriosa dei Frari, Venice

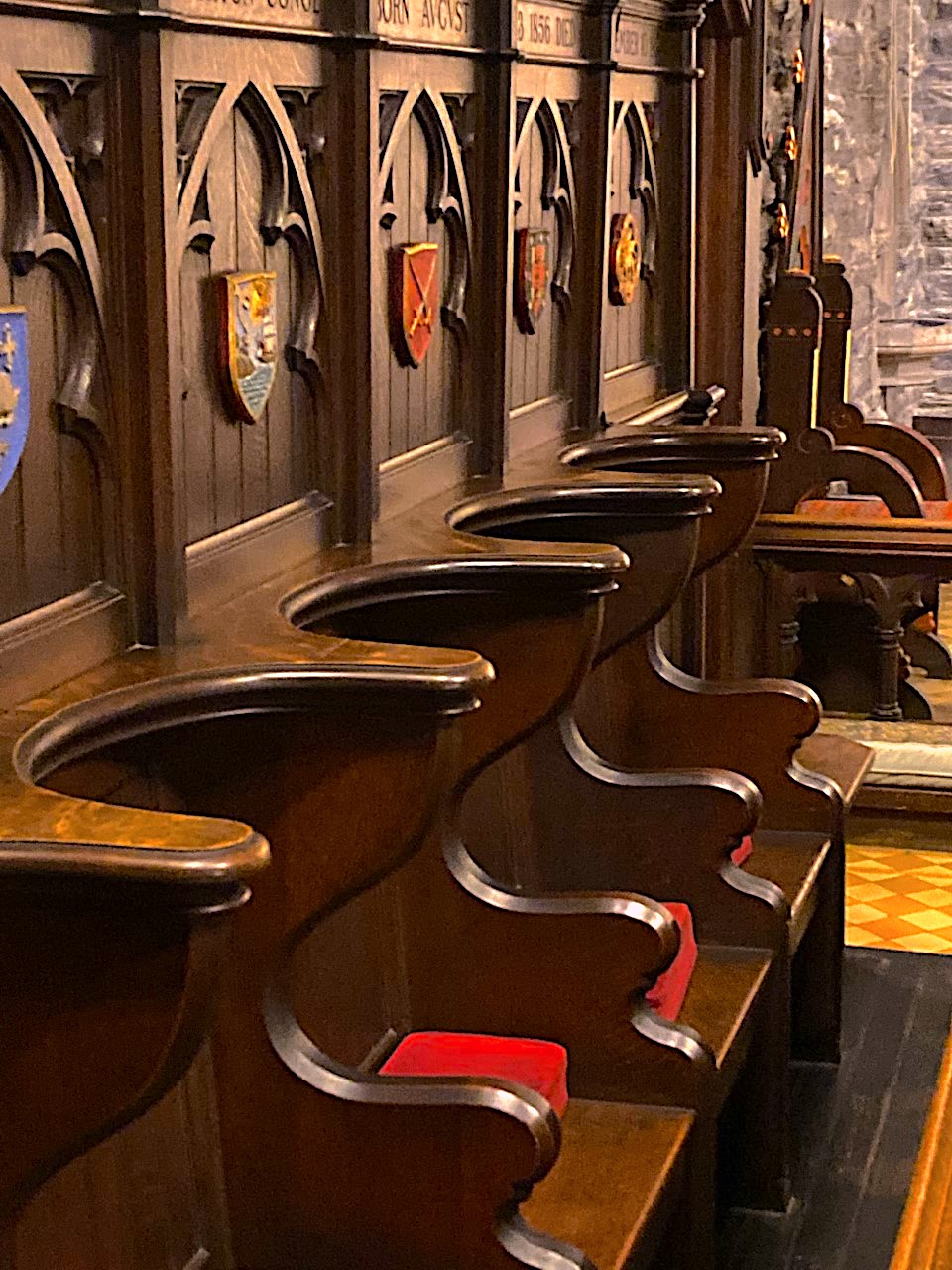
Choir stalls at the Church of the Good Shepherd (Rosemont, Pennsylvania)

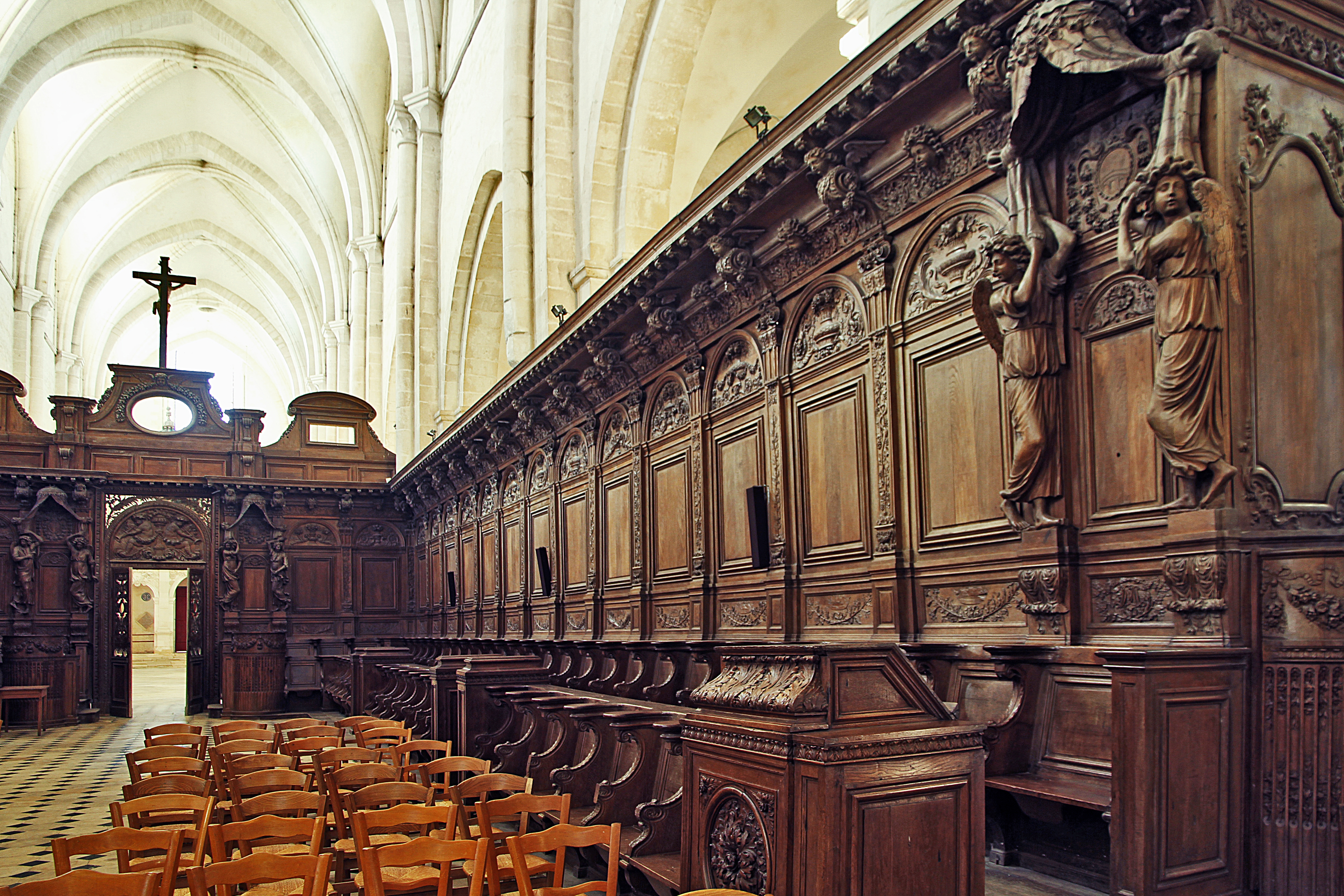
17th-century choir stalls of the Pontigny Abbey, France

Choir stalls in Auch Cathedral - Seen from the high altar towards the choir organ

== See also ==
- Cathedral architecture
- Cathedral floorplan
- Kathisma
- Kliros
- Matroneum
