= Kliros =

Church section dedicated to the choir

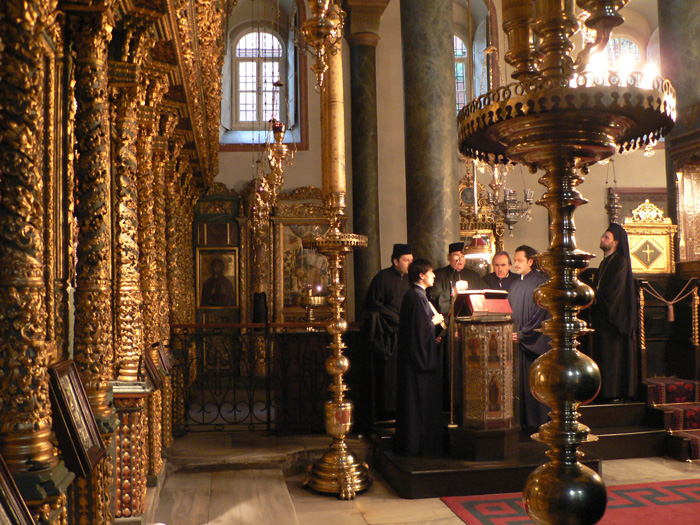
Chanters singing on the kliros at the Church of St. George, Patriarchate of Constantinople

The kliros (Greek: κλῆρος klēros, plural κλῆροι klēroi; Slavonic: клиросъ, "kliros" or sometimes крилосъ, "krilos") is the section of an Eastern Orthodox, Armenian, or Eastern Catholic church dedicated to the choir. It refers both to the general space in which chanters or singers assemble for the services, as well as to the actual music stand or shelves on which music is stored and read.

== Overview ==
The name derives from the Greek word for "lot", since originally those who read and sang were chosen by lot.

Historically, in cathedrals, monasteries and larger establishments such as chapels belonging to seminaries and major parishes, there would have been kliroi on both right and left sides of the church. The result is two choirs which sing antiphonally, much as monastic and cathedral choirs of the Western Churches still have today. This was the practice in the Byzantine Imperial Cathedral of Hagia Sophia, in Constantinople, whose historical liturgical practice became the standard for all churches following the Byzantine liturgical tradition.

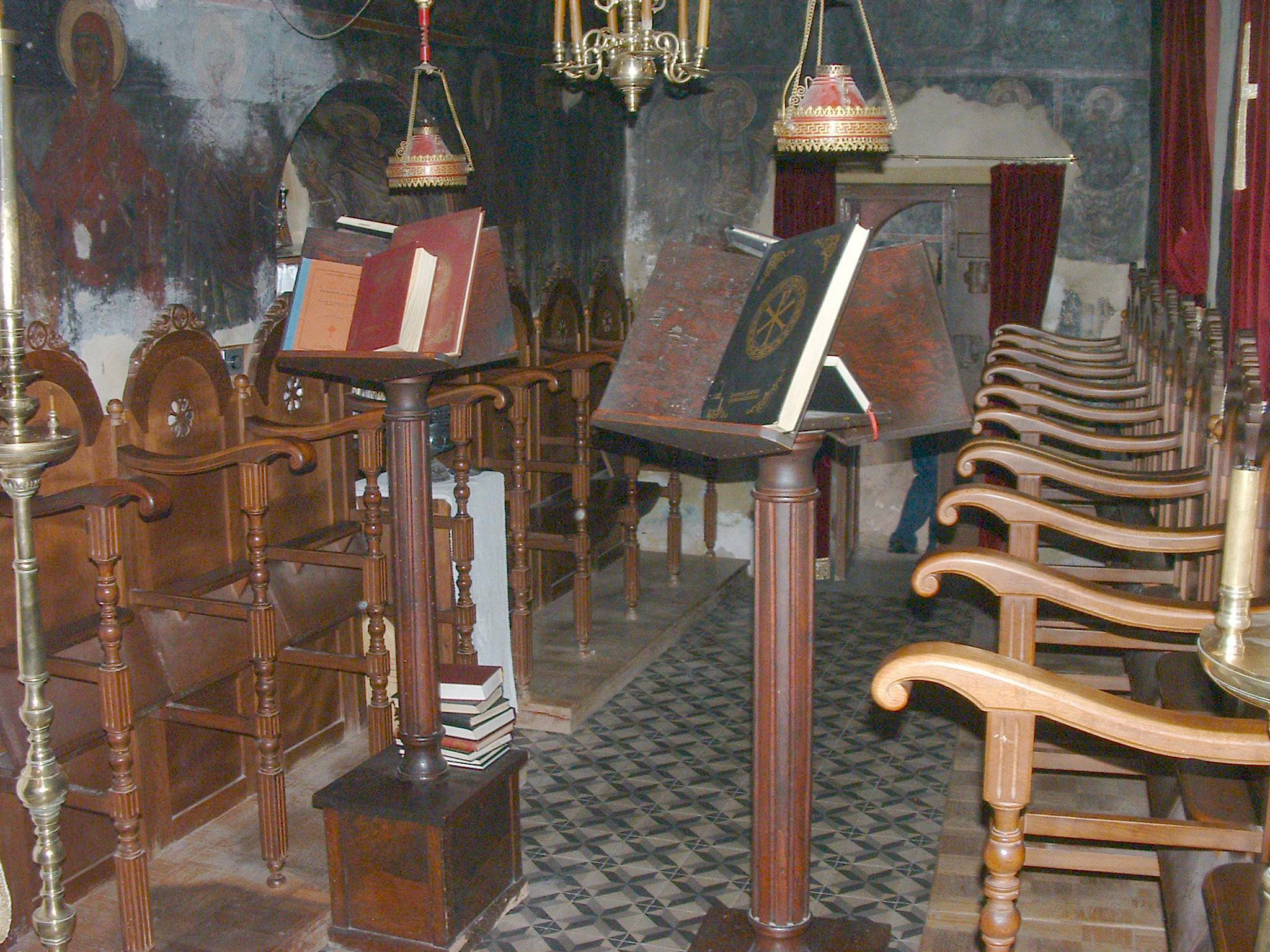
Kliros with analogia for liturgical books.

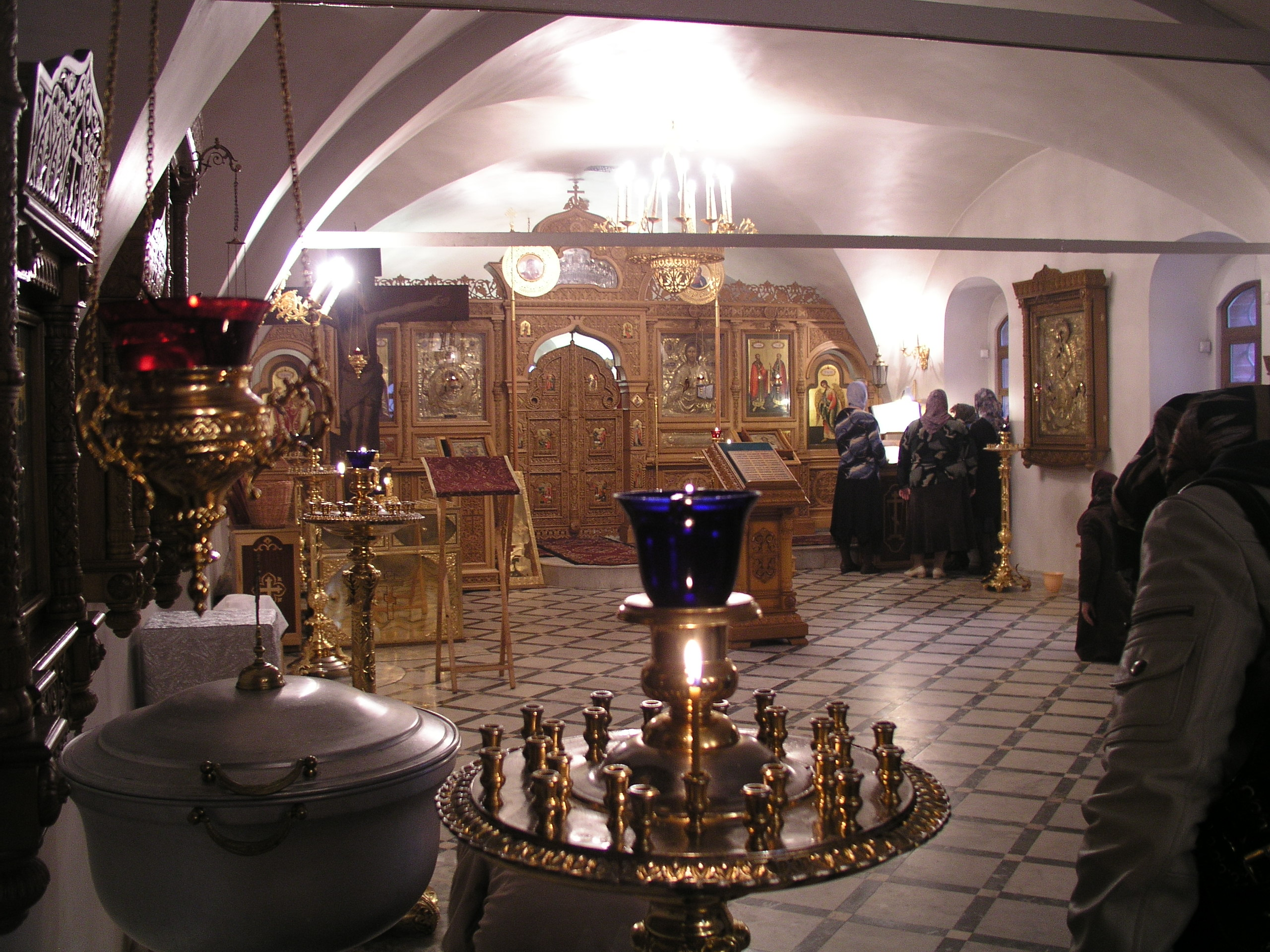
Kliros in Church of St. John the Baptist, Yaroslavl, Russia

This arrangement presupposes a number of singers on each side, adding up to a reasonably large total, and two highly trained chanters skilled in leading the services. Though not as much of an issue today as it was decades ago, highly trained chanters are still quite rare in non-Orthodox countries, and so most churches have only one kliros which is often to the right of the iconostasis. Nevertheless, almost all churches in traditionally Orthodox Nations may continue to have two kliroi.

The Russian Orthodox Church will often have, in addition to a kliros by the iconostasis, a choir loft above the great doors of the west entrance of the church.

In churches of the Greek and some select Russian parishes that still utilize Byzantine Chant, the Psaltis who sing at the kliros will often wear a black riassa (outer-cassock).

In the Armenian Church, all members of the choir at the kliros wear a stikharion (robe made out of fine material).
