= Kuigõ =

Village in Estonia

- Location within Estonia
- Coordinates: 57°43′34″N 27°28′46″E
- Country: Estonia
- County: Võru County
- Time zone: UTC+2 (EET)

Kuigõ is a settlement in Setomaa Parish, Võru County in southeastern Estonia.

Kuigõ Chapel, a small wooden Seto chapel, is located in the village.
