= Icon case =

Case or shelf for keeping and displaying religious icons

An icon case, or a kiot (Russian: киот, Ukrainian: кіот, Greek: προσκυνητάρι), is a decorated case (usually foldable) or glass shelf for keeping and displaying religious icons.

== Etymology ==
The East Slavic form kiot, sometimes used in English, derives from the Greek κῑβωτός, "box, ark". The usual word in Greek, however, is προσκυνητάρι, from προσκυνητής, "pilgrim", referring to the carrying of icons in cases or stands by pilgrims.

== Design ==
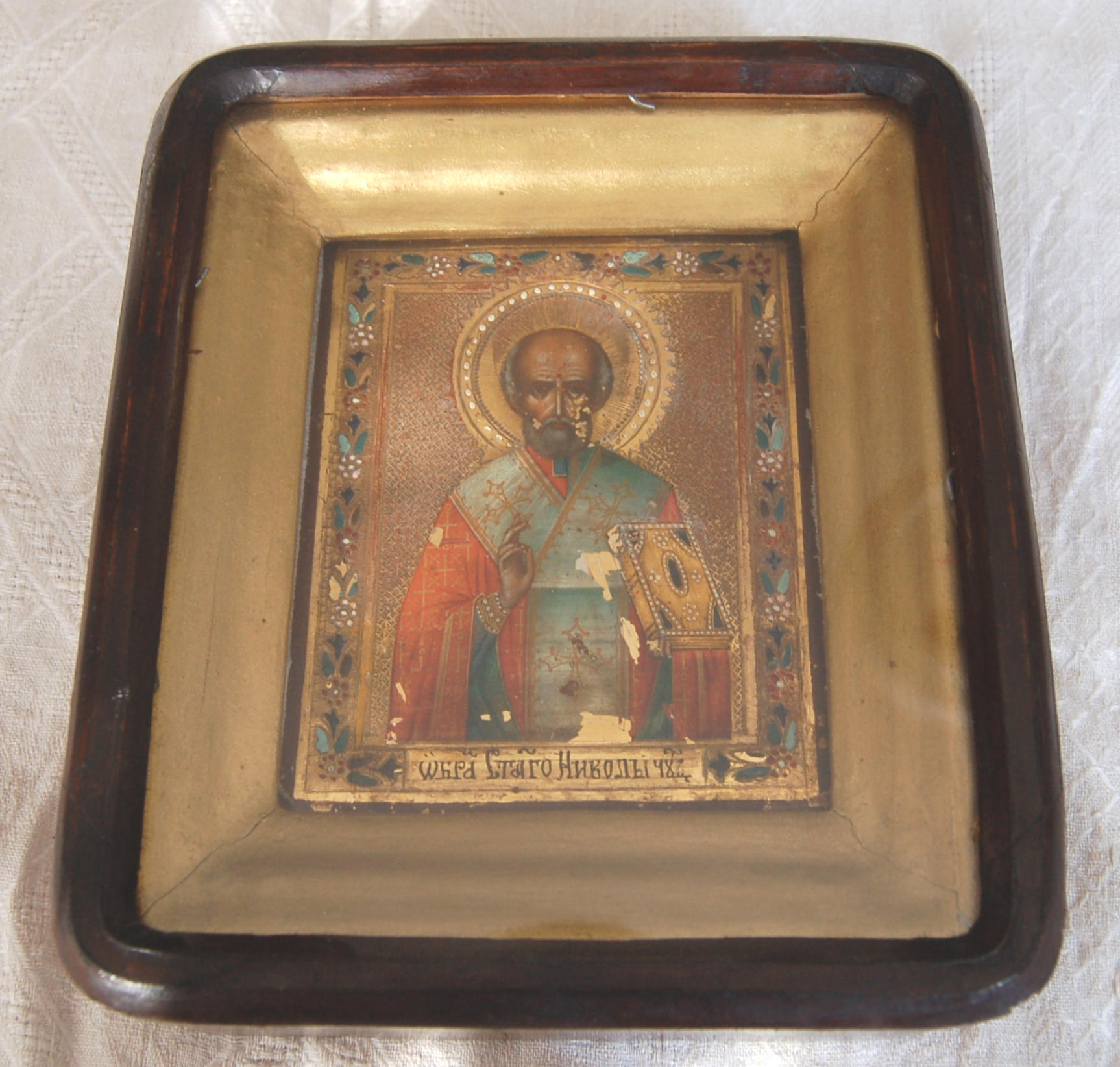
"Icon of Saint Nikola the Wonderworker", as restored in the 1990s, inside a kiot - Moscow Governorate, Russia

Icon cases vary in size and in design. Common Greek kiots are tall and typically made of carved wood. They can be ornate or simple. They resemble windows with a roof or dome on top, and therefore support the Eastern Orthodox Church theology which regards icons as "windows into heaven". The icon usually is placed vertically rather than at an angle (as on an analogion). Sometimes there may be a secondary icon on a slanted shelf below the main icon. Some Greek kiots also have a step or platform so that veneration of the icon is easier.

Often parishes with a kiot will place their patron saint, or the patron saint of the city in the kiot. Larger cathedrals may have many kiots set up around the nave. Some large Greek cathedrals feature kiots placed against a wall - resembling an iconostasis - with multiple saints on them.

Additionally, some kiots may also contain a special place in front of the icon for the faithful to place beeswax candles. They may also have a votive hanging in front of the icon itself.

== Gallery ==
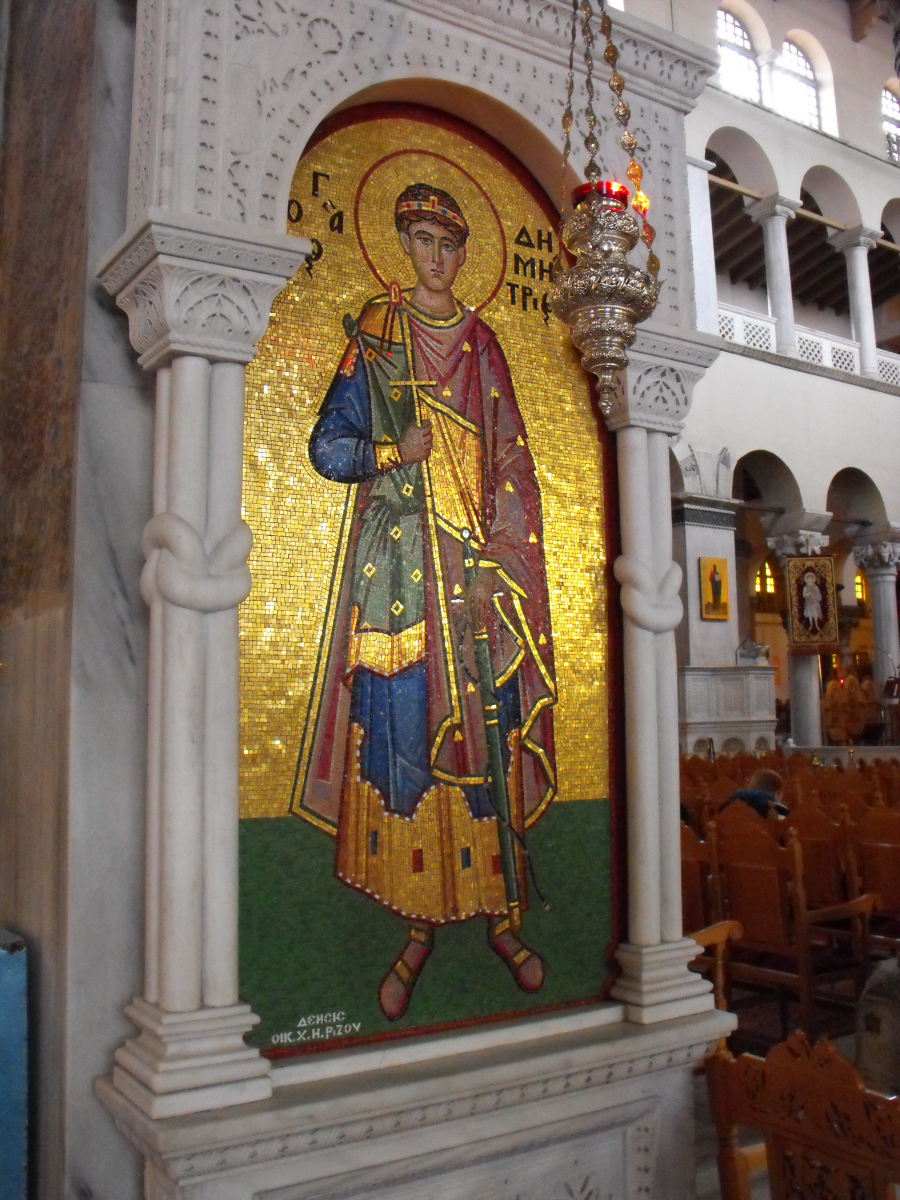
St. Demetrios mosaic icon inside a marble kiot. Thessaloniki, Greece

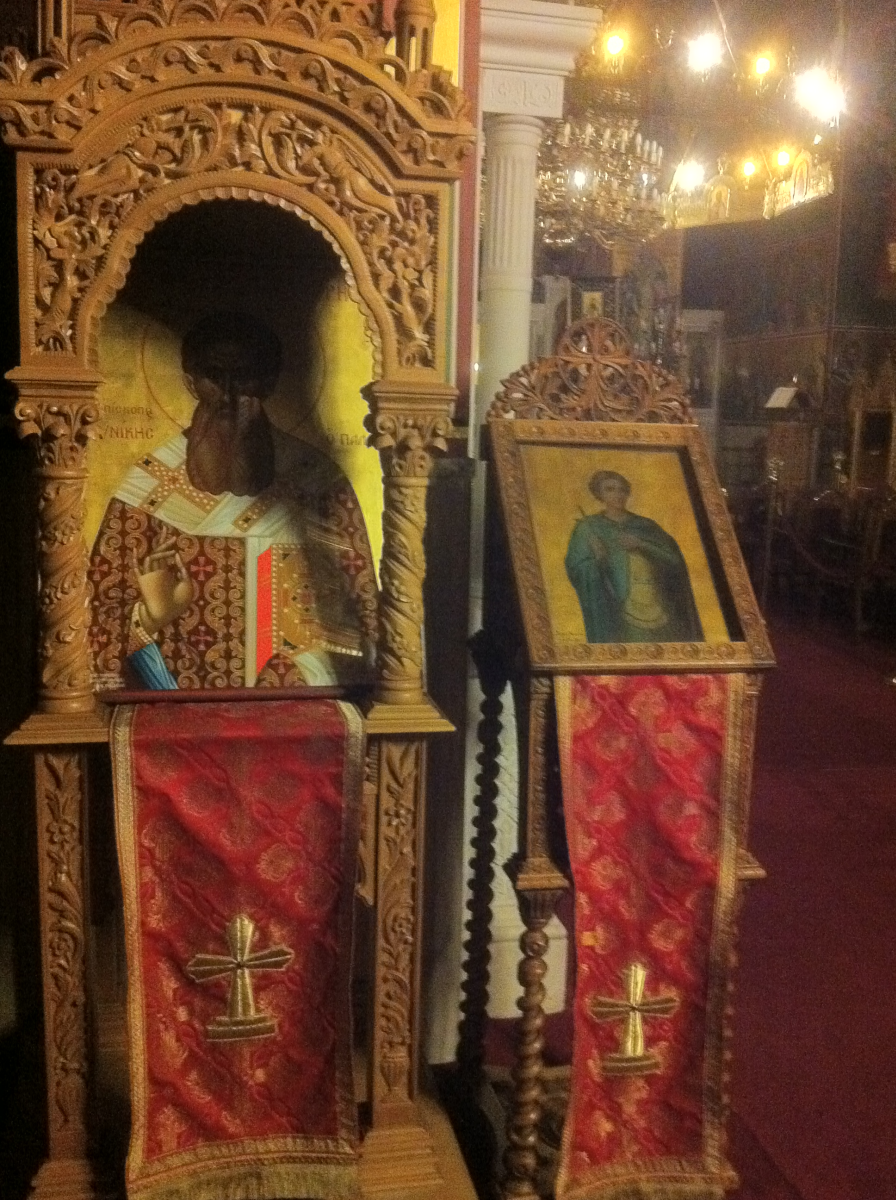
Icon of St. Gregory Palamas inside a kiot. Sitting alongside is an analogion. Thessaloniki, Greece

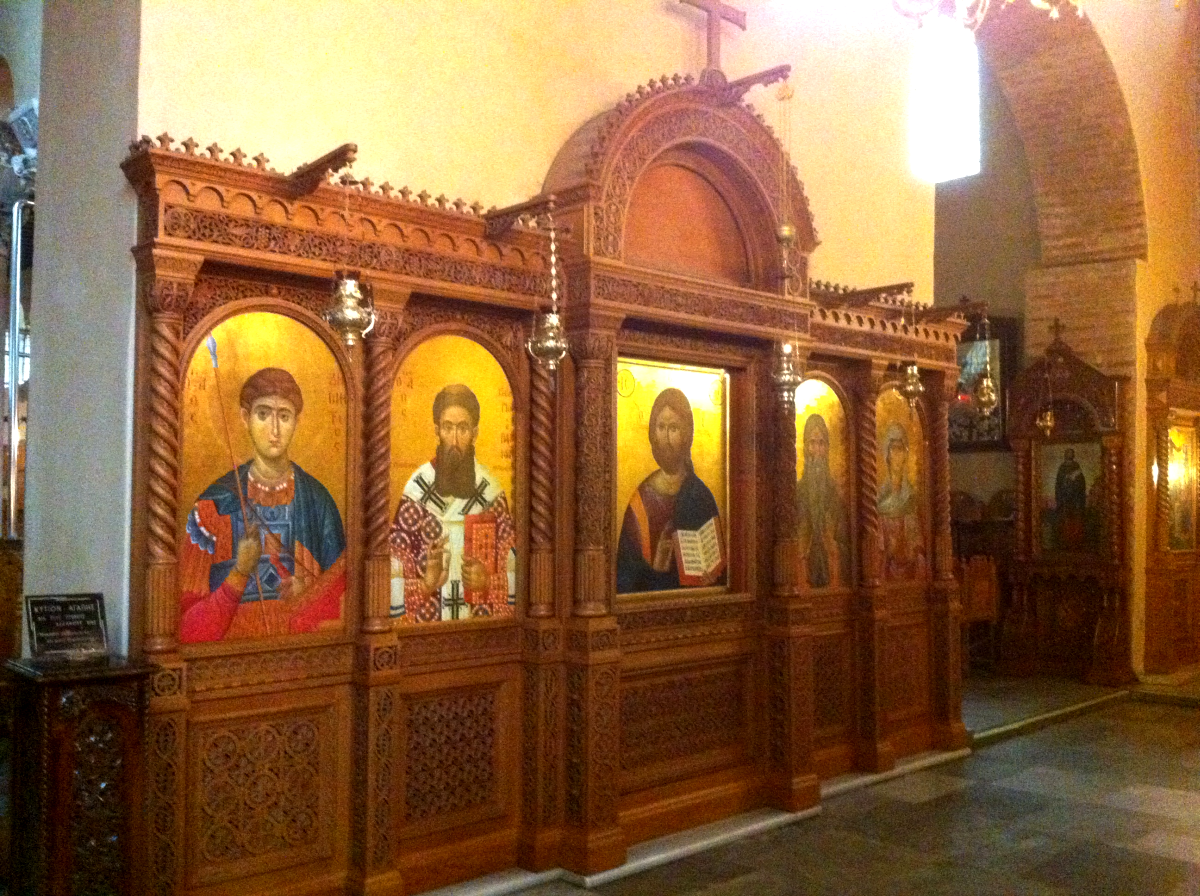
Icons inside a larger kiot made for several icons, placed in a church narthex for veneration. Thessaloniki, Greece

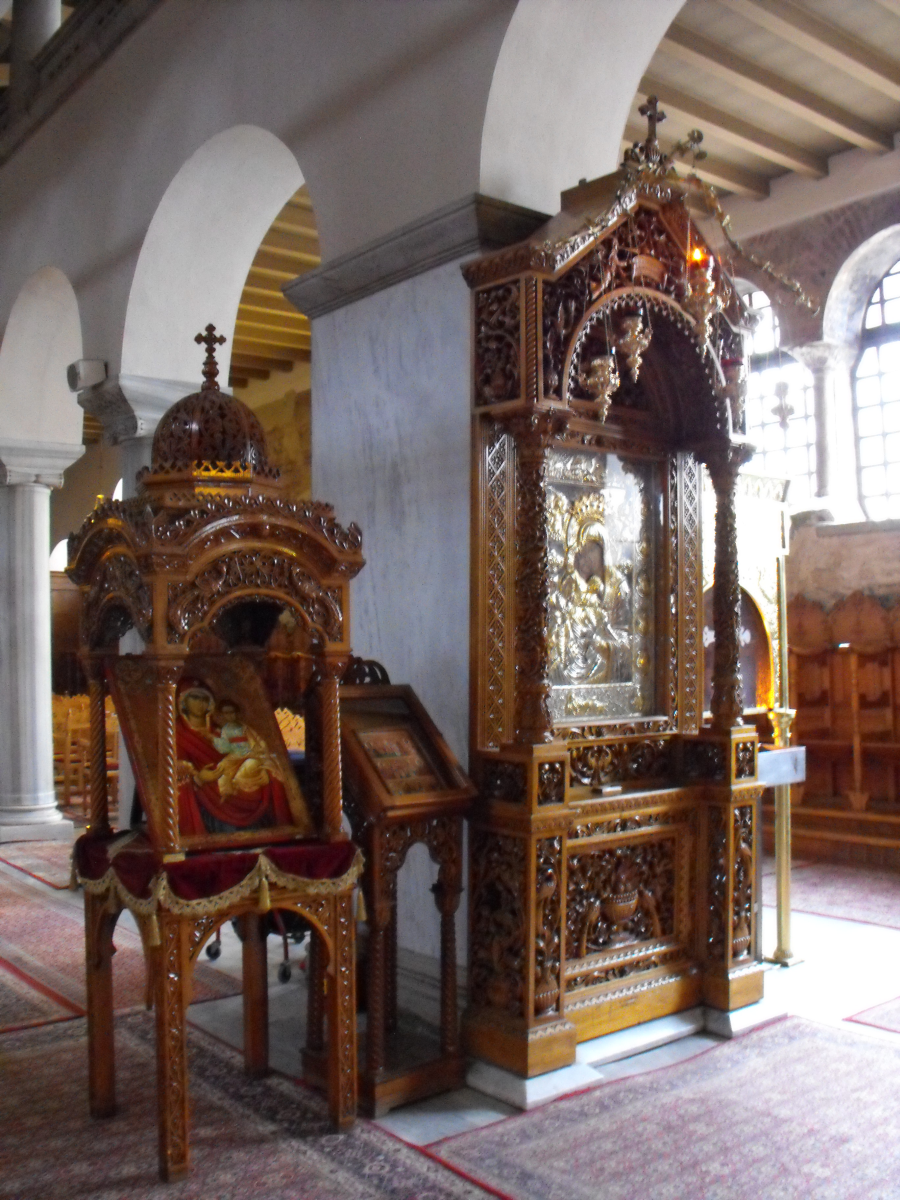
Two kiot with an analogion in between. Thessaloniki, Greece

== See also ==
- Analogion
- Iconostasis
- Icon corner
