= Analogion =

Sloped stand for icons

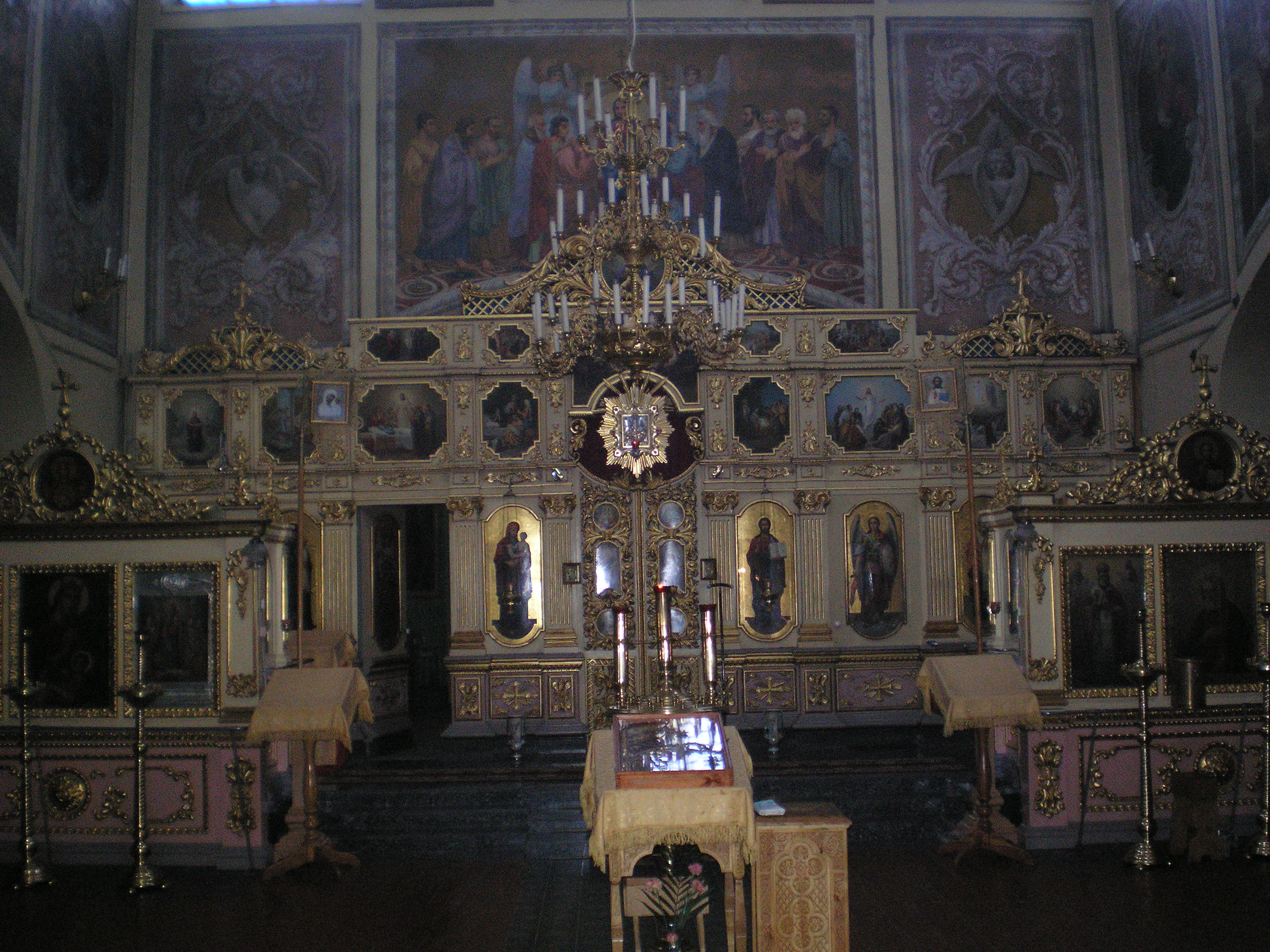
Three analogia, covered with gold cloth. (Saint Nicholas monastery, Gomel, Belarus)

An analogion (Greek: Ἀναλόγιον or ἀναλογεῖον) is a slanted stand on which icons or the Gospel Book are placed for veneration by the faithful in the Eastern Orthodox Church and Eastern Catholic Churches. It may also be used as a lectern to read from liturgical books during the Divine Liturgy and canoncial hours.

== Design ==
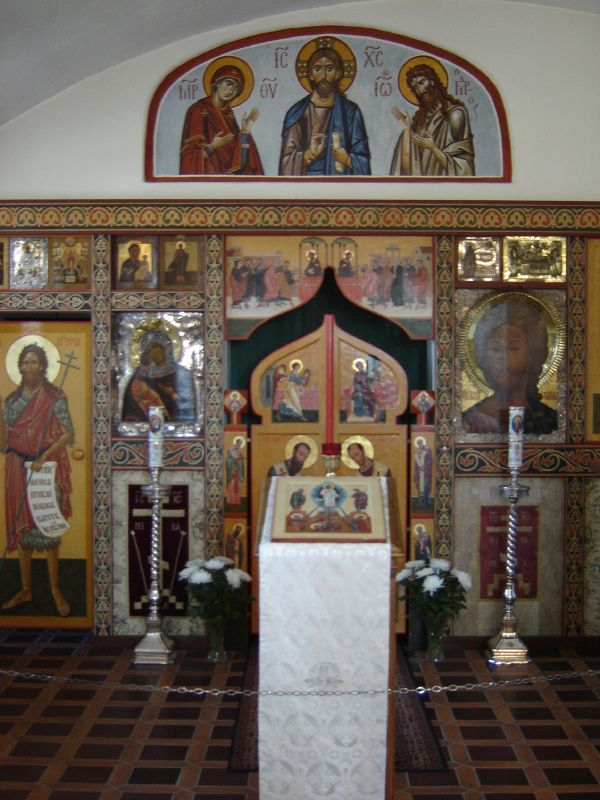
Analogion, vested in white, at New Valamo monastery in Heinävesi, Finland

The analogion is normally slanted slightly, to make it easier for the one standing in front of it to see the icon or book laid on it. The analogion may have four legs or only one in the center. It is often covered with a rich cloth (antipendium), which either partially or completely covers the analogion on top and all sides. Some analogia are made so they fold for easy portability, some are intricately carved of fine wood, and some are simple frameworks intended to be completely covered with cloth. These are normally light enough to be moved about without too much difficulty.

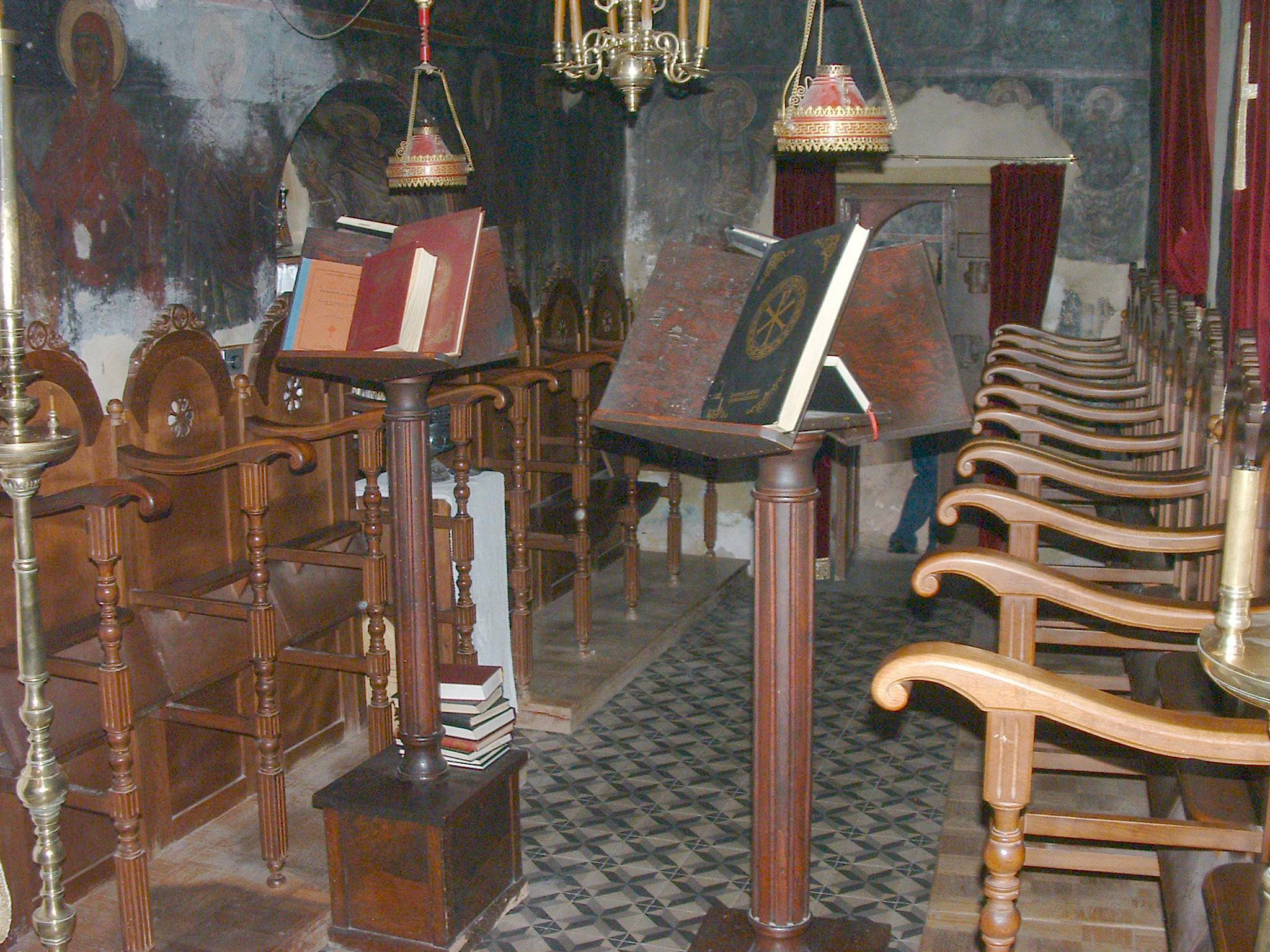
Kliros with analogia for liturgical books

There is also a type of analogion which is used in the kliros by the chanters. This often has two or three sides, and turns to allow singers to more easily refer to the numerous liturgical texts required during liturgies.

An older Greek design for this type of analogion is octagonal, with a flat top instead of slanted. This style is still found in use on Mount Athos and at other ancient monasteries throughout the world. Sometimes, this type of analogion is intricately inlaid with mother of pearl or other semi-precious materials.

A similar piece of furniture with a different function is the tetrapodion, which is a table set in the center of the church. It is often covered with a cloth, and upon it are placed objects to be blessed.

Another term often used for the special stand for religious holy books in the choir section is the Psaltiri.

== Use ==
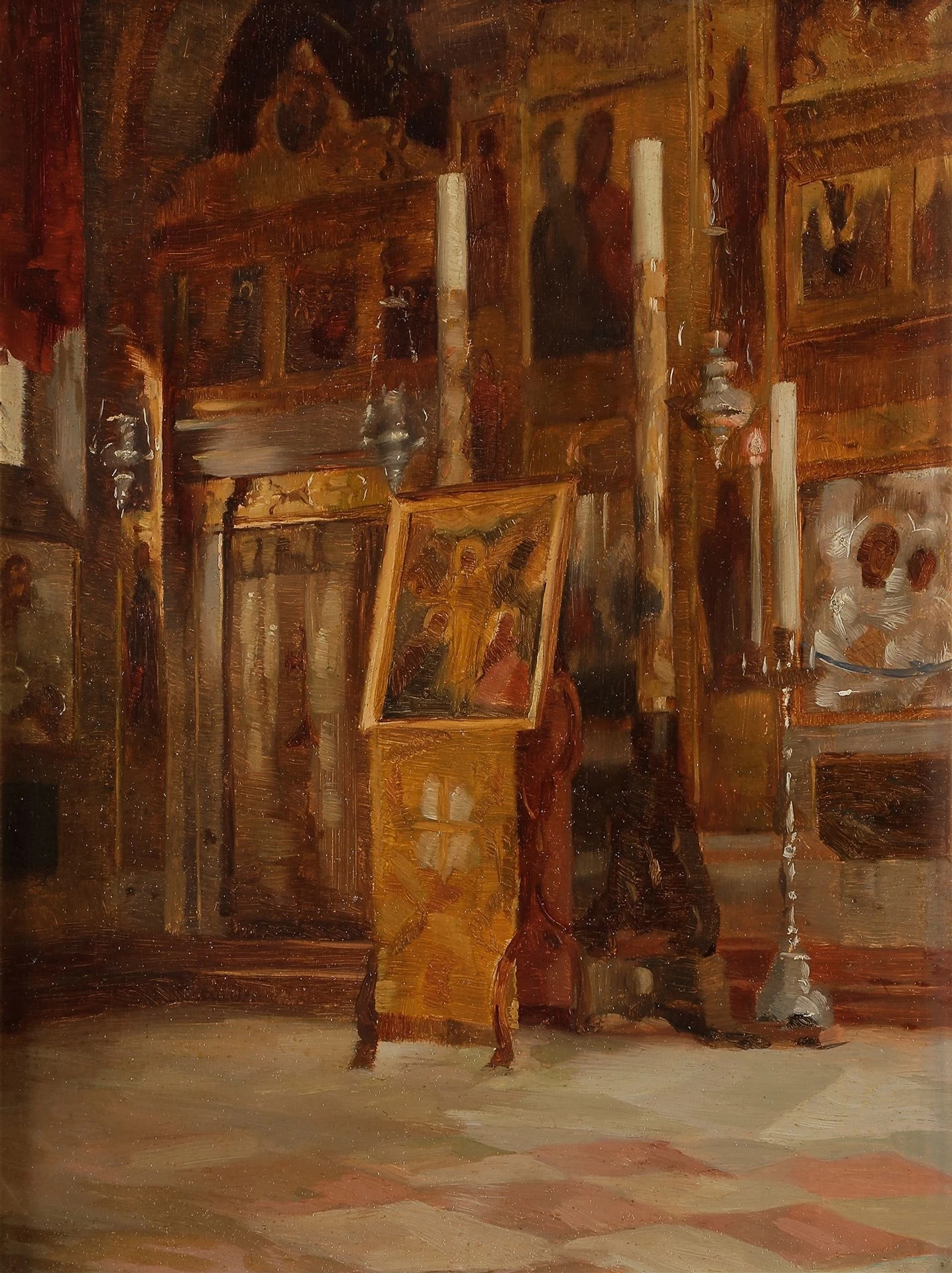
The Analogion by Théodore Jacques Ralli c. 1873-1909

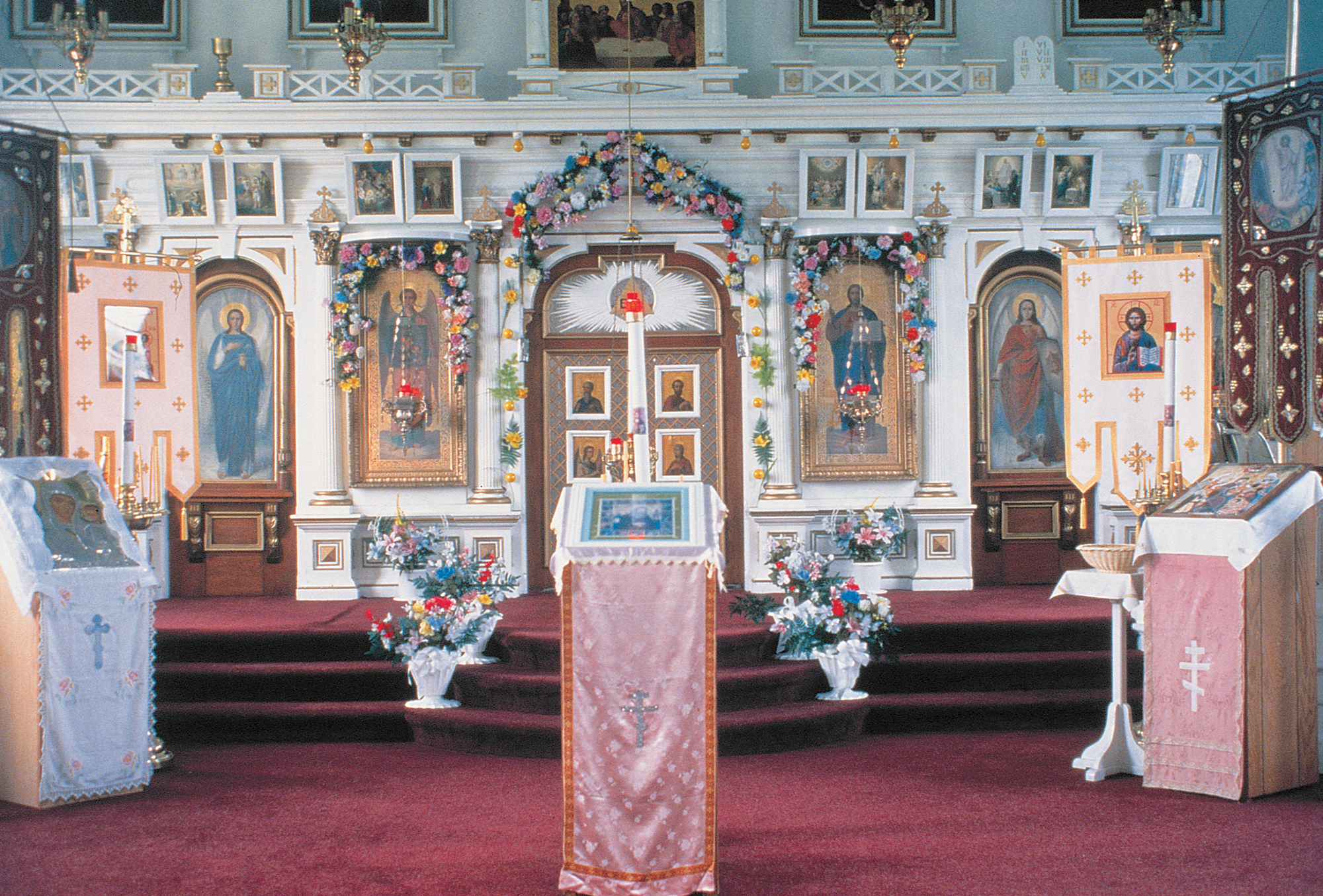
Russian Orthodox Church in Seldovia, Alaska

Analogia are used for the veneration of icons, usually with a candlestand beside or behind it, or an oil lamp burning above it. The candlestand may hold one candle and be used to illuminate the icon, or it may be part of a candlestick for the faithful to offer candles as they venerate the icon.

On higher-ranking feasts of the church year, when the chanting of the Polyeleos is called for, an analogion is placed in the center of the nave of the church with candles, and the icon of the feast being celebrated is placed thereon. At the highpoint of the service, all of the lights in the church are lit and the clergy and people gather around the icon on the analogion in the center of the church for the chanting of festive hymns and the reading of the Matins Gospel lesson.

During the Divine Liturgy, an analogion is placed in front of the Holy Doors for the reading of the Gospel and altar servers will stand to either side with processional candles. If a deacon is reading the Gospel, the analogion will be set so that he faces East (towards the Altar) as he reads; if a priest is reading, the analogion will be set so that he faces West (towards the people).

When a priest or bishop hears Confession, he will do so standing beside an analogion on which has been placed a Gospel Book and a Cross. The penitent will venerate the Gospel and Cross and then kneel before the analogion, holding his right hand in the manner of making the Sign of the Cross and touching the foot of the Cross while making his confession.

== See also ==
- Credence table
- Prie-dieu

== Bibliography ==
- Parry, Ken; Melling, David J.; Brady, Dimitri; Griffith, Sidney H.; Healey, John F., eds. (1999). The Blackwell Dictionary of Eastern Christianity. Malden, MA.: Blackwell Publishing. ISBN 0-631-23203-6.
