= Lake Obinitsa =

Lake in Estonia

- Obinitsa järv (Estonian)
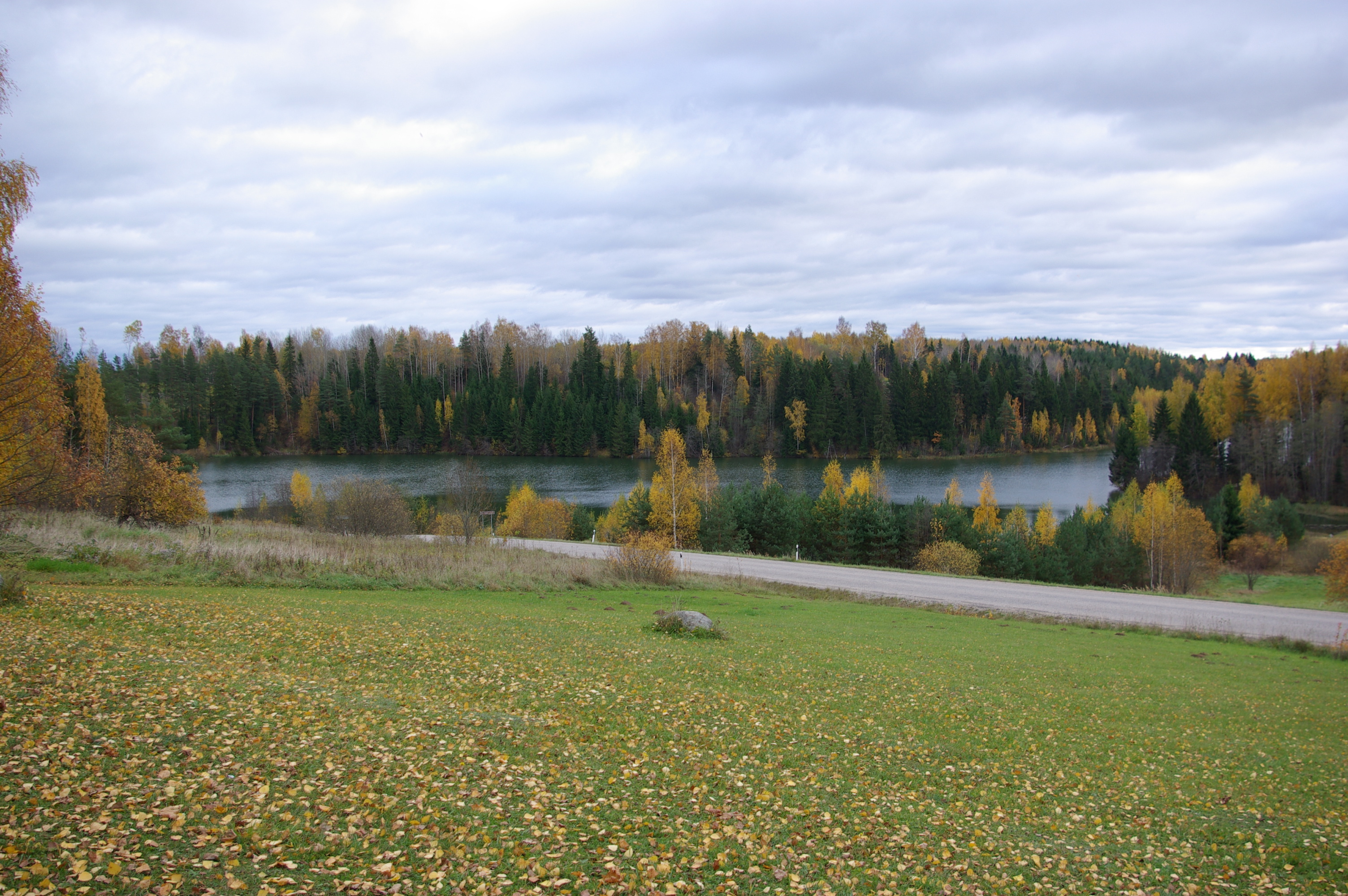
- Lake Obinitsa in 2013

- Location within Estonia
- Location: Estonia
- Coordinates: 57°48′16″N 27°27′13″E
- Primary inflows: Obinitsa Creek
- Primary outflows: Obinitsa Creek
- Catchment area: 47,800 km^{2} (18,500 sq mi)
- Basin countries: Estonia
- Max. length: 1,450 meters (4,760 ft)
- Surface area: 21.1 hectares (52 acres)
- Average depth: 4.1 meters (13 ft)
- Water volume: 846,000 cubic meters (29,900,000 cu ft)
- Shore length^{1}: 4,540 meters (14,900 ft)
- Surface elevation: 73.6 meters (241 ft)
- Settlements: Obinitsa
- ^{1} Shore length is not a well-defined measure.

Lake Obinitsa (Estonian: Obinitsa järv, also Obinitsa paisjärv, Tuhkvitsa veehoidla, or Tääglova veehoidla) is a lake in Estonia. It is mostly located in the village of Obinitsa in Setomaa Parish, Võru County, with a small part in neighboring Klistina. It is an artificial lake; construction of Lake Obinitsa on the Obinitsa Creek (also known as the Tuhkvitsa Creek) ended in 1995. The clear-watered lake is used for swimming, fishing, and boating. There is a sandstone outcrop and a cave that has formed because of springs on the left shore of Lake Obinitsa. The cave, associated with many legends, is called Juudatarõ. On the high banks of Lake Obinitsa stands the monument to the Singing Mother of the Seto People.

== Physical description ==
The lake has an area of 21.1 hectares (52 acres). The lake has an average depth of 4.1 meters (13 ft). It is 1,450 meters (4,760 ft) long, and its shoreline measures 4,540 meters (14,900 ft). It has a volume of 846,000 cubic meters (29,900,000 cu ft).

== See also ==
- List of lakes of Estonia
