= Ojaotsa Springs =

Group of springs in Estonia

Coordinates: 57°45′57″N 27°28′16″E

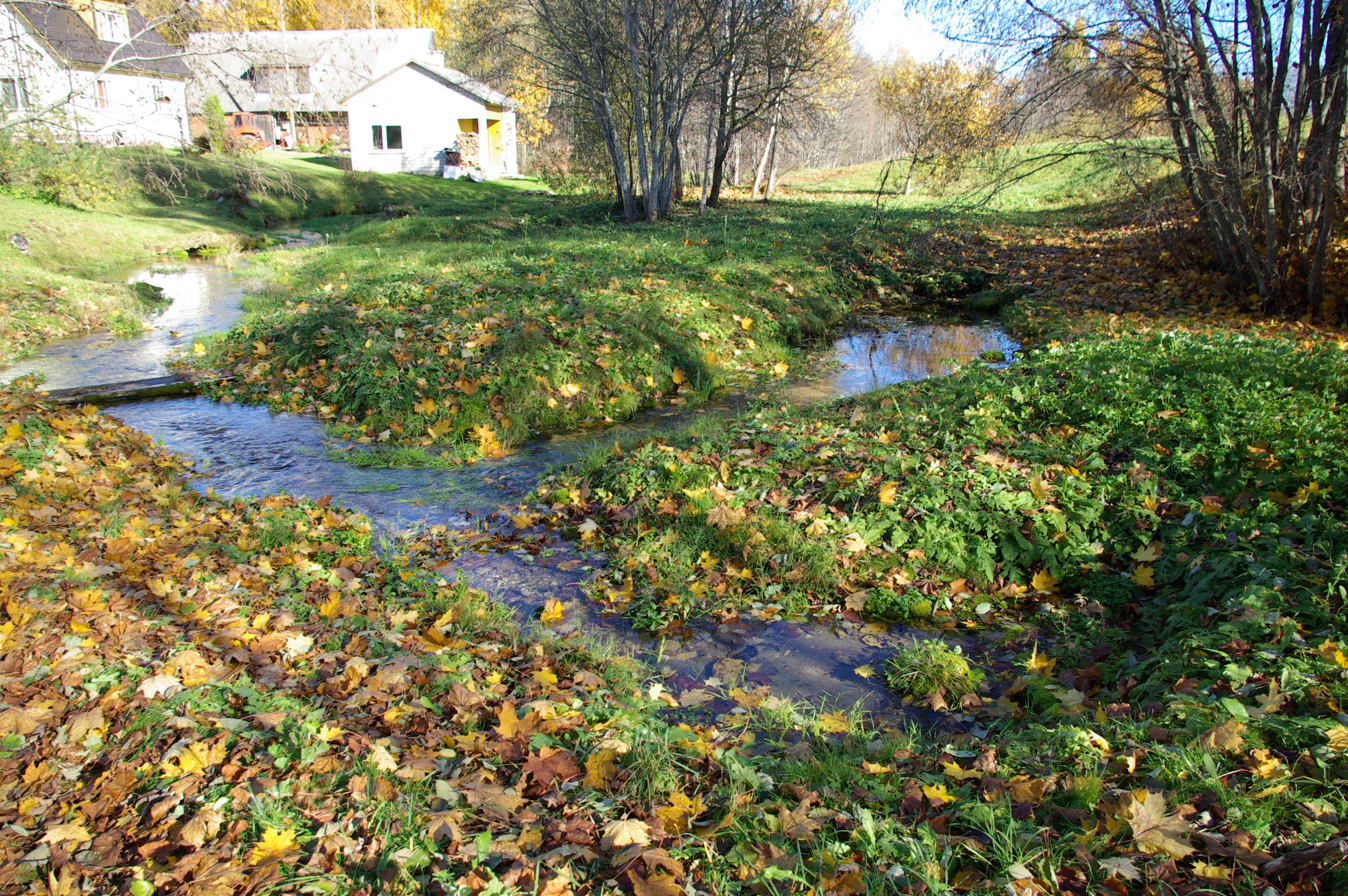
Ojaotsa Springs

Ojaotsa Springs, also known as Serga Springs, is a set of springs in the village of Meremäe in Estonia. It is the source of Obinitsa Creek (also known as Tuhkvitsa Creek). The springs might potentially be rising springs forming a travertine deposit. Ojaotsa Springs belongs to the pre-selection of Natura 2000 nature conservation areas; it has 10 groundwater openings and a flow rate of 150 liters per second (5.3 cu ft/s).
