= Singing Mother =

Monument in Estonia

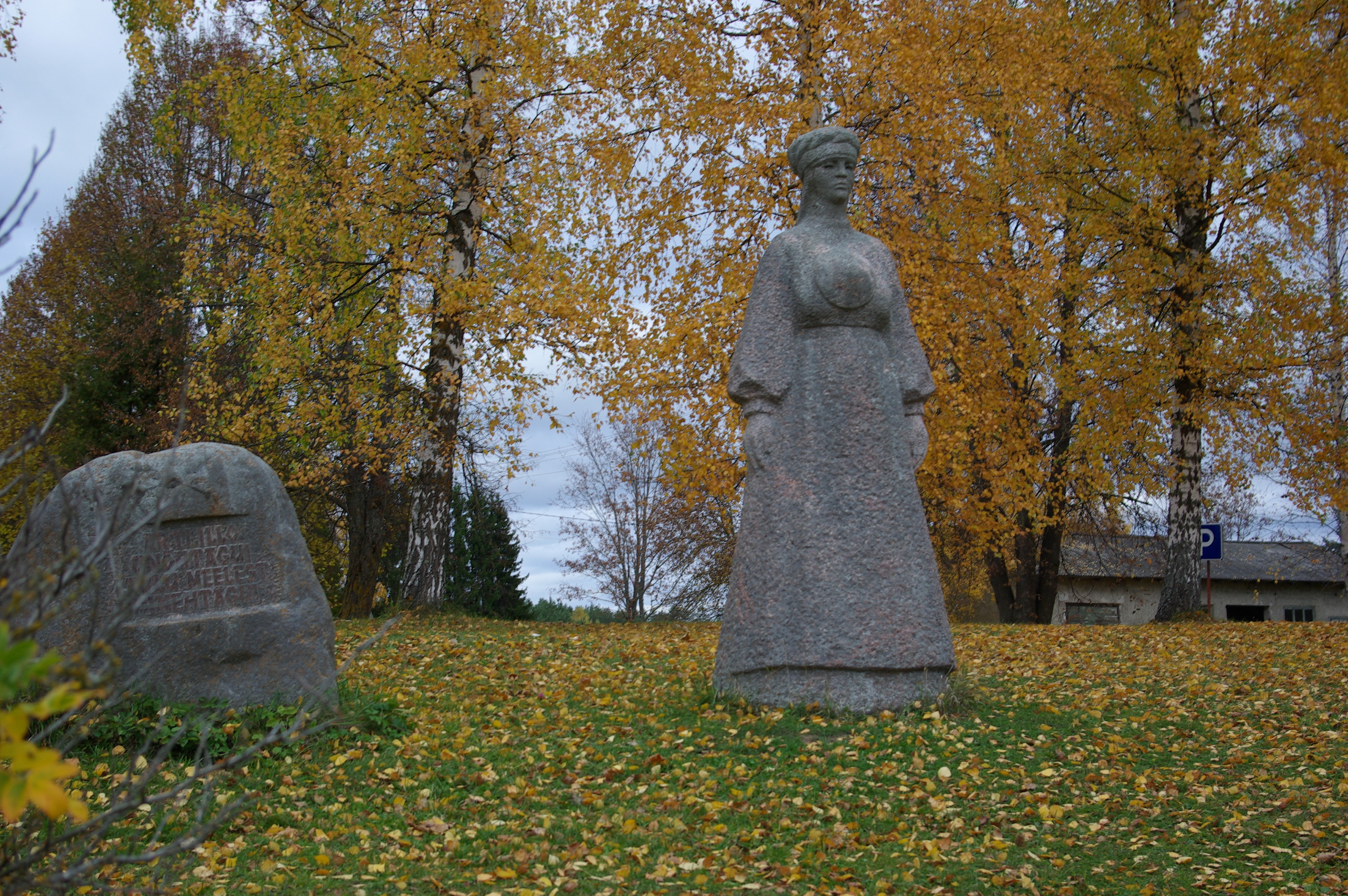
- The monument to the Singing Mother of the Seto People
- 57°48′40″N 27°26′49″E
- Location: Obinitsa, Estonia

Singing Mother is the monument to the Singing Mother of the Seto People; it is a memorial in Obinitsa in Estonia. It was erected in memory of the singing mothers of Setomaa, in particular, to Hilana Taarka, Miko Ode and Irö Matrina.

The memorial for Seto Lauluimä (singing mother) was opened during the fourth Setu Leelopäevad (singsong festival) in 1986. The creator of the monument is sculptor Elmar Rebane. The monument is made of granite and stands 3 metres tall and weighs 9 tons.

On 3 June 1995, after the opening-blessing procession across Obinitsa Lake, other memorial stones were placed for other local singers. These include the following:

- Mast Hemmo (1900–1983)
- Lust Nasta (1893–1983)
- Luik Okse (1882–1958)
- Vahvik Tepa (1893–1978)
