= Obinitsa (stream) =

River in Estonia

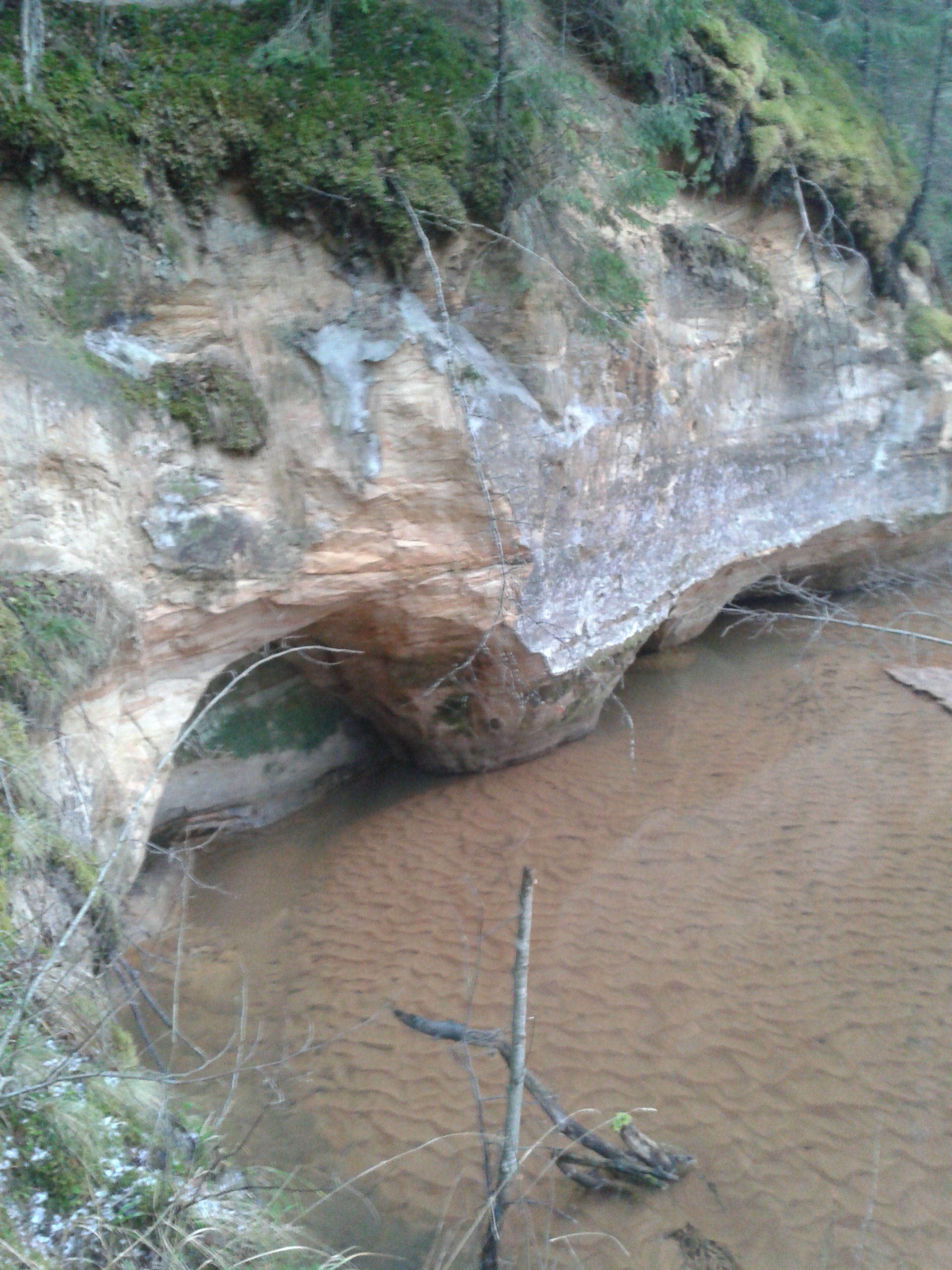
- The Obinitsa

Location
- Country: Estonia

Physical characteristics
- Source
  - location: Ojaotsa Springs
  - coordinates: 57.74966°N 27.4714°E
- Mouth
  - location: Piusa River
  - coordinates: 57.83426°N 27.4649°E
- Length: 13.4 km (8.3 mi)
- Basin size: 45.2 km^{2} (17.5 sq mi)

The Obinitsa (also known as the Tuhkvitsa) is a stream in the rural municipality of Meremäe that flows into the Piusa River.

== Geography ==
The source of the Tuhkvitsa is Ojaotsa Springs. The stream flows entirely through Meremäe and passes the Obinitsa Reservoir. The villages of Tepia, Serga, Tobrova, Lepä, and Obinitsa are located along the stream. Tepia Sacrificial Spring is located near the village of Tepia, next to the stream. It is believed to be a holy spring and to have healing properties.

== Mills ==
There were eight water-powered mills on the Tuhkvitsa: Serga, Tepia, Lepa, Tobrova, Porga, Kruuse, Sonne, and Ala-Tsumba. Only the Serga Mill had an undershot water-wheel as a power source; all the other mills had overshot wheels. Today, all the mills have disappeared. The banks of the upper reaches of the stream are shallow and border on farmlands and meadows, but from the Kruuse Mill onward a deep natural valley has formed and the banks are mostly covered in alder. The banks used to be bordered by hayfields and pastures, and there was no natural vegetation.
