= Pelsi =

Village in Estonia

- Village
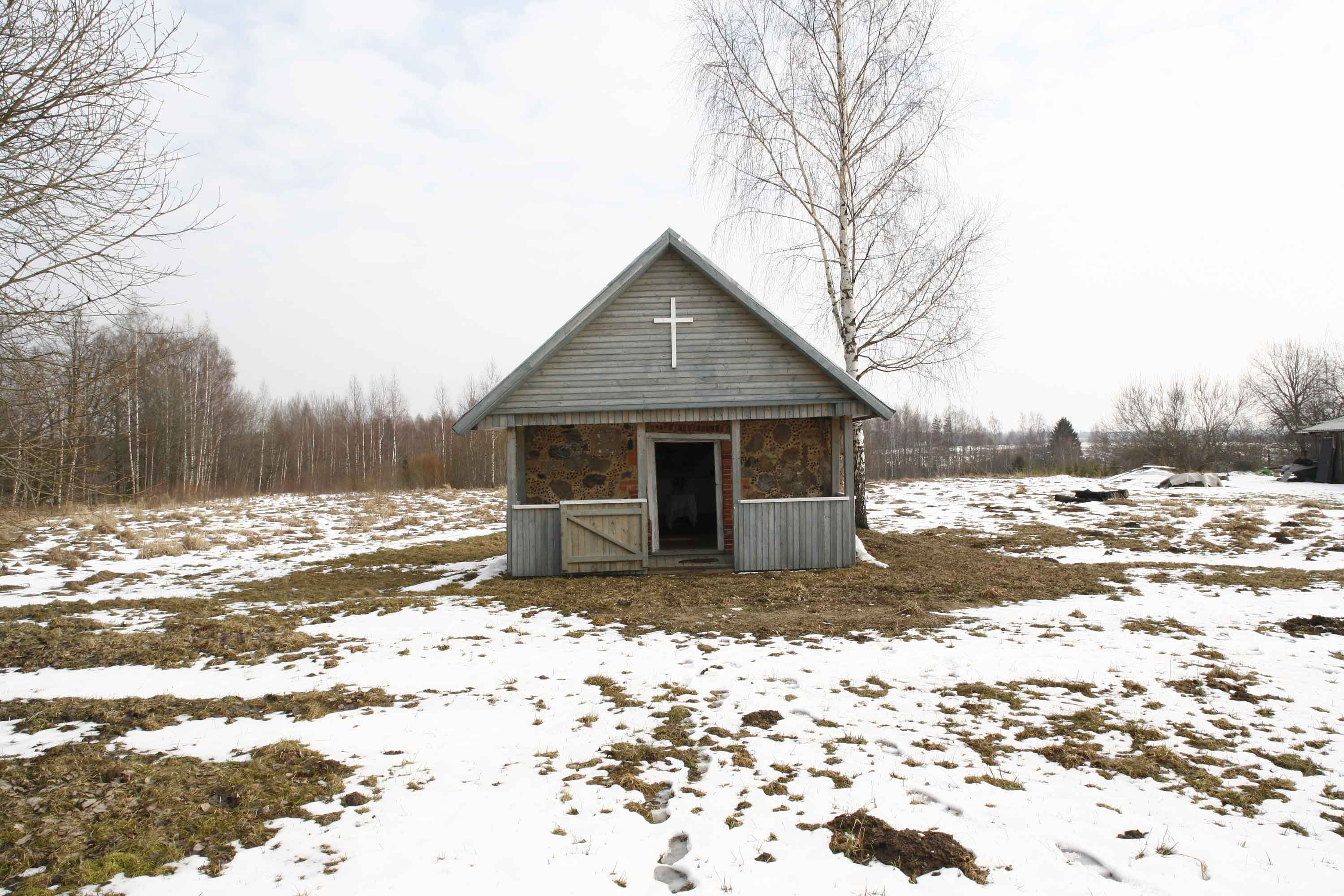
- Pelsi Chapel

- Location within Estonia
- Coordinates: 57.7194°N 27.4256°E
- Country: Estonia
- County: Võru County
- Parish: Setomaa Parish
- Time zone: UTC+2 (EET)
  - Summer (DST): UTC+3 (EEST)

Pelsi is a village in Setomaa Parish, Võru County in Estonia.

Pelsi Chapel, a small wooden Seto chapel, is located in the village.
