= Pelsi Chapel =

Seto chapel in Estonia

- Pelsi tsässon
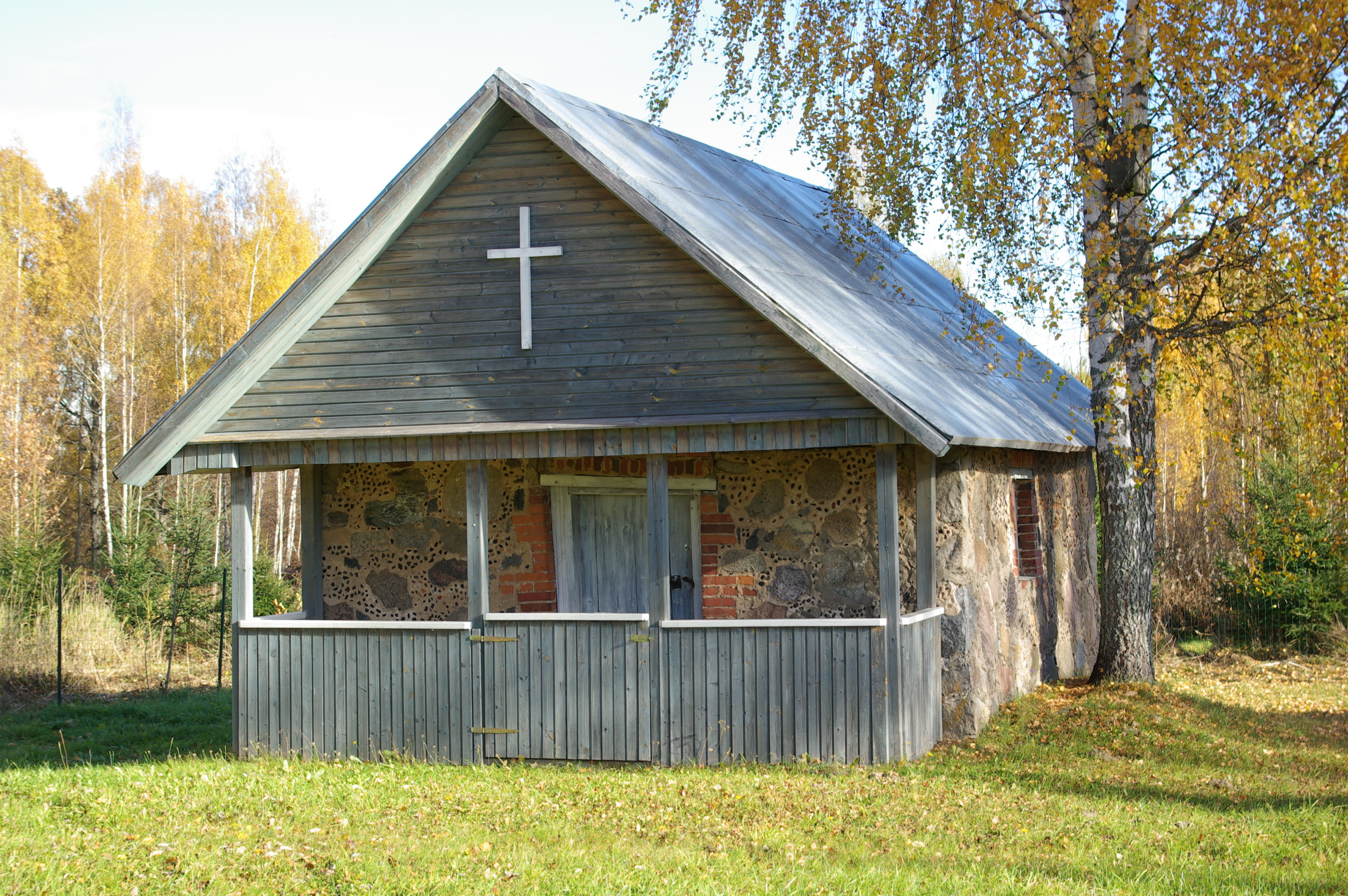

Religion
- Affiliation: Estonian Apostolic Orthodox Church
- Year consecrated: 1896

Location
- Location: Pelsi, Setomaa Parish, Estonia
- Interactive map of Pelsi Chapel
- Coordinates: 57°43′11.66″N 27°25′35.55″E

Architecture
- Materials: stone

Pelsi Chapel (Estonian: Pelsi tsässon) is a small Seto chapel in the village of Pelsi, Setomaa Parish, Võru County in southeastern Estonia.

== General information ==
Pelsi Chapel is located on the land unit of Grossmann. The chapel is dedicated to the Saint, Righteous Anna. The feast-day for this chapel is Anna day, the 7 August (25 July according to Julian calendar). The chapel is still used and in good condition. The building is not state-protected.

== Building data ==
Pelsi Chapel is a small, square one-storied stone building with a gable roof, the dimensions of which are 676 x 511 cm. The building has one interior room (14.5 m2) and an open entrance-room (5.9 m2). The walls of the chapel are made from granite stones and bricks, bound together by lime-mortar and decorated. The thickness of the walls is 70–80 cm. There are different ornaments and initials (that could belong to the builder) on the small stones stowed inside the outer wall mortar. The renovation done in the last few years has somewhat changed the exterior look of the building. If it used to be a building with an extended shelter above the entrance, now an entrance-room with a roof that supports on strong posts has been added to it. The entrance-room has a beam fence and vertical boarding barrier and a gate. There used to be a shelter without sides in front of the chapel that was supported by two angled posts. The height of the building from the foundation up to where the rafter and the wall unite is 240 cm and the height up to the ridge is 465 cm. At the moment, the building has a spindle-tin roof. From a 1970s photograph, it can be seen that at that time, the roof of the chapel was made from shingles. The walls of the building on the inside are of granite stones bound together with lime-mortar and of brick finishing. There have been cracks in the walls, mended by cement-based mixture. To stop the building from falling apart, the inner walls have had metal joint fasteners in them that have been removed by now. The size for the door opening is 116 x 180 cm. The vertical supporting posts have been installed inside the walls. The boards fixed on the crosspiece by fishtail tenon have 57 cm forged hinges. The door dimensions are 96 x 170 cm. The door is made from four wide boards. The size of the window is 66 x 80 cm. The wooden jamb is old and has a simple wooden window with four panes.

== Furnishing ==
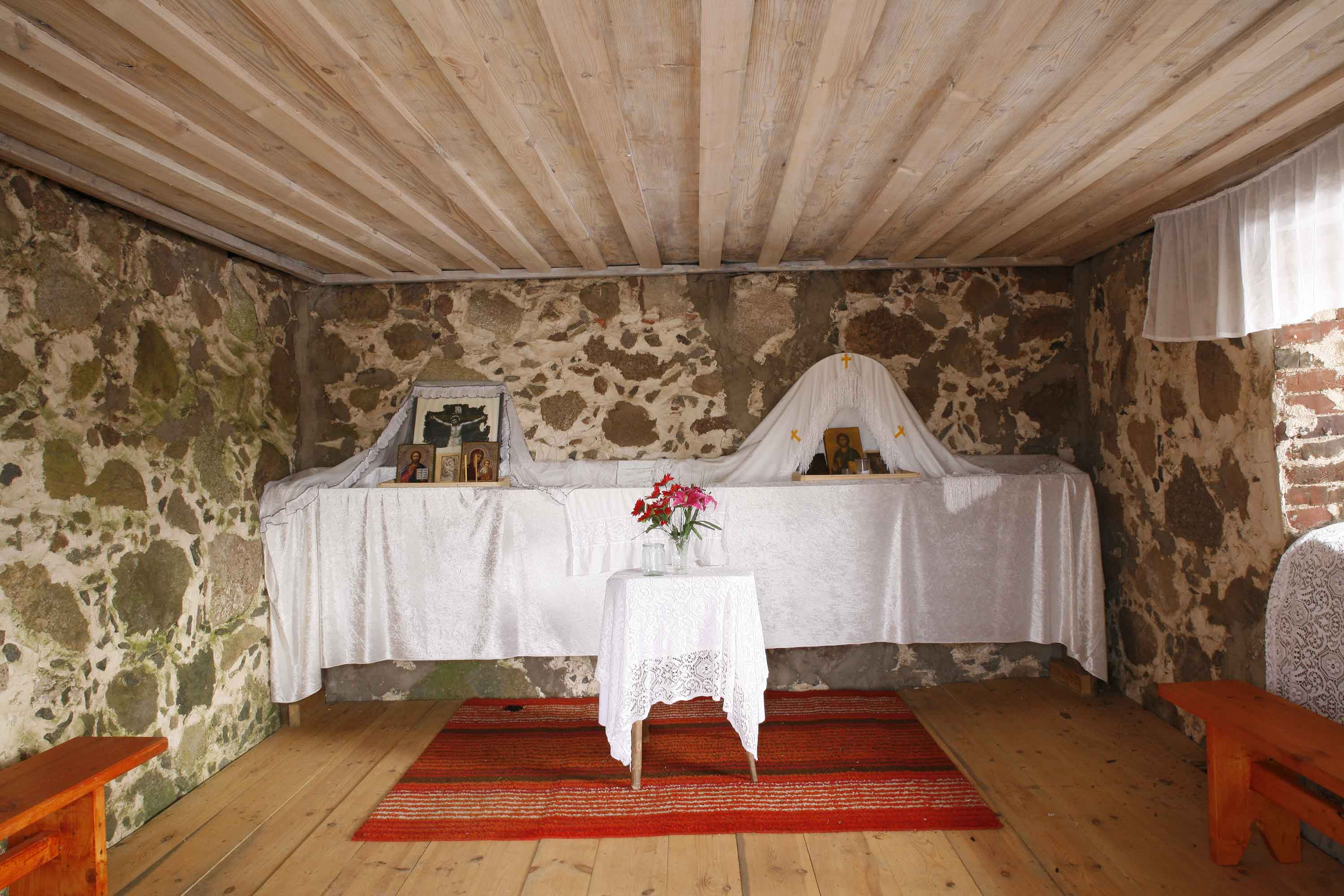
Interior view of Pelsi Chapel in 2008

There is an icon table in the rear wall of the building, which in turn has a thicker table attached to it for candles. There are a few newer small printed icons on the table. They are covered by a Soviet-time icon scarf made from tulle curtain and a modern fringed icon scarf made from white cloth. There are a few benches, one of which is older than the other.
