= Uue-Võidu Landscape Conservation Area =

Protected area in Estonia

- Location within Estonia
- Location: Estonia
- Coordinates: 58°23′50″N 25°36′11″E
- Area: 52 ha (130 acres)
- Established: 1964 (2009)

Uue-Võidu Landscape Conservation Area is a nature park which is located in Viljandi County, Estonia.

The area of the nature park is 52 ha.

The protected area was founded in 1964 to protect Karula Lake, Karula Manor Park and theirs surrounding areas.
