= Lake Tsäpsi =

Lake in Estonia

- Location within Estonia
- Coordinates: 57°40′11″N 27°19′30″E
- Basin countries: Estonia
- Max. length: 630 meters (2,070 ft)
- Surface area: 10.2 hectares (25 acres)
- Average depth: 2.7 meters (8 ft 10 in)
- Max. depth: 6.8 meters (22 ft)
- Water volume: 251,000 cubic meters (8,900,000 cu ft)
- Shore length^{1}: 1,880 meters (6,170 ft)
- Surface elevation: 203.9 meters (669 ft)
- ^{1} Shore length is not a well-defined measure.

Lake Tsäpsi (Estonian: Tsäpsi järv, also Järvemäe järv or Järveoja järv) is a lake in Estonia. It is located in the village of Viitka in Võru Parish, Võru County.

== Physical description ==
The lake has an area of 10.2 hectares (25 acres). The lake has an average depth of 2.7 meters (8 ft 10 in) and a maximum depth of 6.8 meters (22 ft). It is 630 meters (2,070 ft) long, and its shoreline measures 1,880 meters (6,170 ft). It has a volume of 251,000 cubic meters (8,900,000 cu ft).

== See also ==
- List of lakes of Estonia
