= Saarjärv Landscape Conservation Area =

Protected area in Estonia

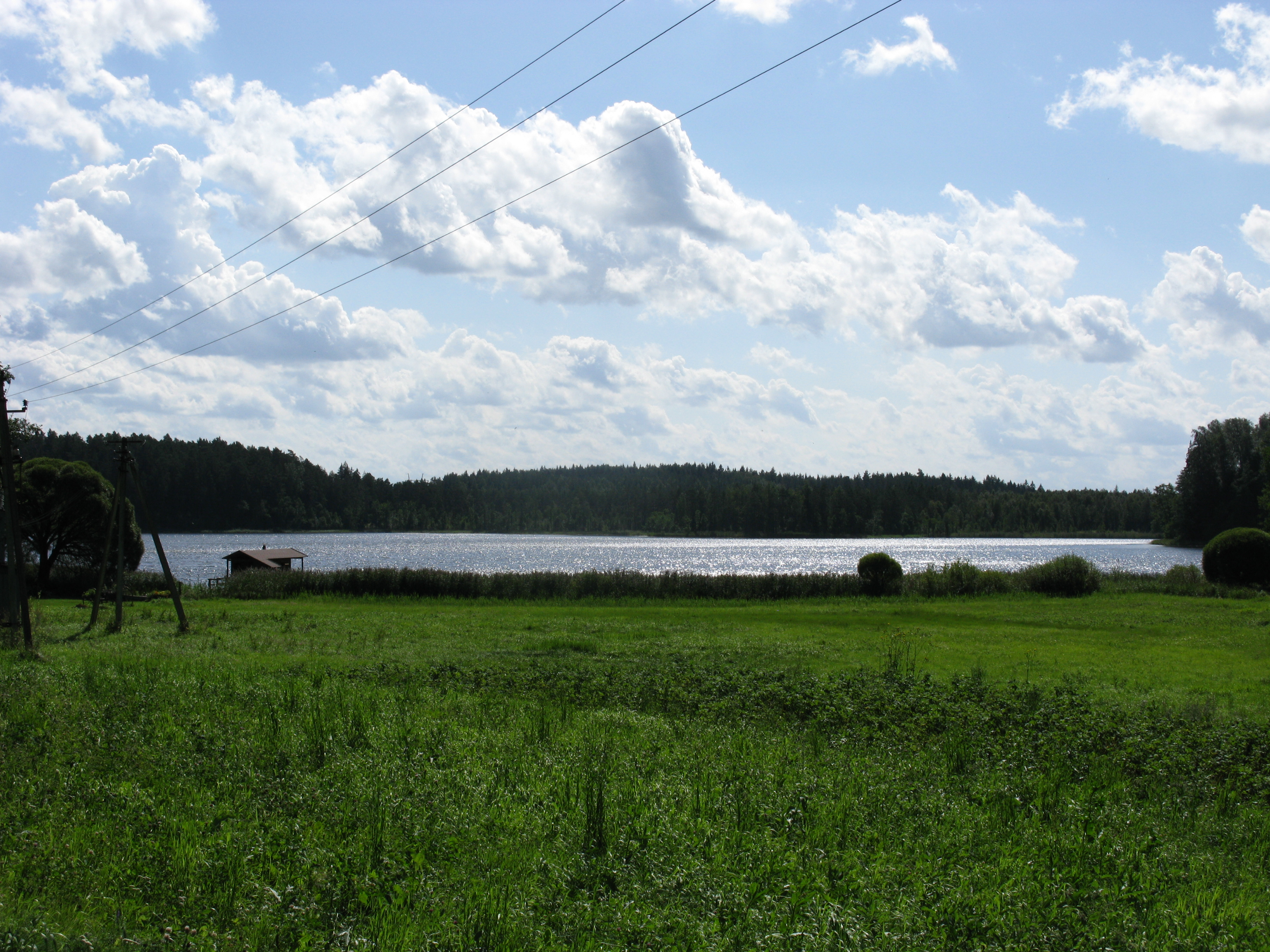

- Location within Estonia
- Location: Estonia
- Coordinates: 58°39′00″N 26°45′50″E
- Area: 159 ha (390 acres)
- Established: 1968

Saarjärv Landscape Conservation Area (Estonian: Saarjärve maastikukaitseala) is a nature park in Jõgeva County, Estonia.

The area of the nature park is 159 ha.

The protected area was founded in 1968 to protect Saare Lake and Saare forest.
