= Ropka-Ihaste Nature Reserve =

Protected area in Estonia

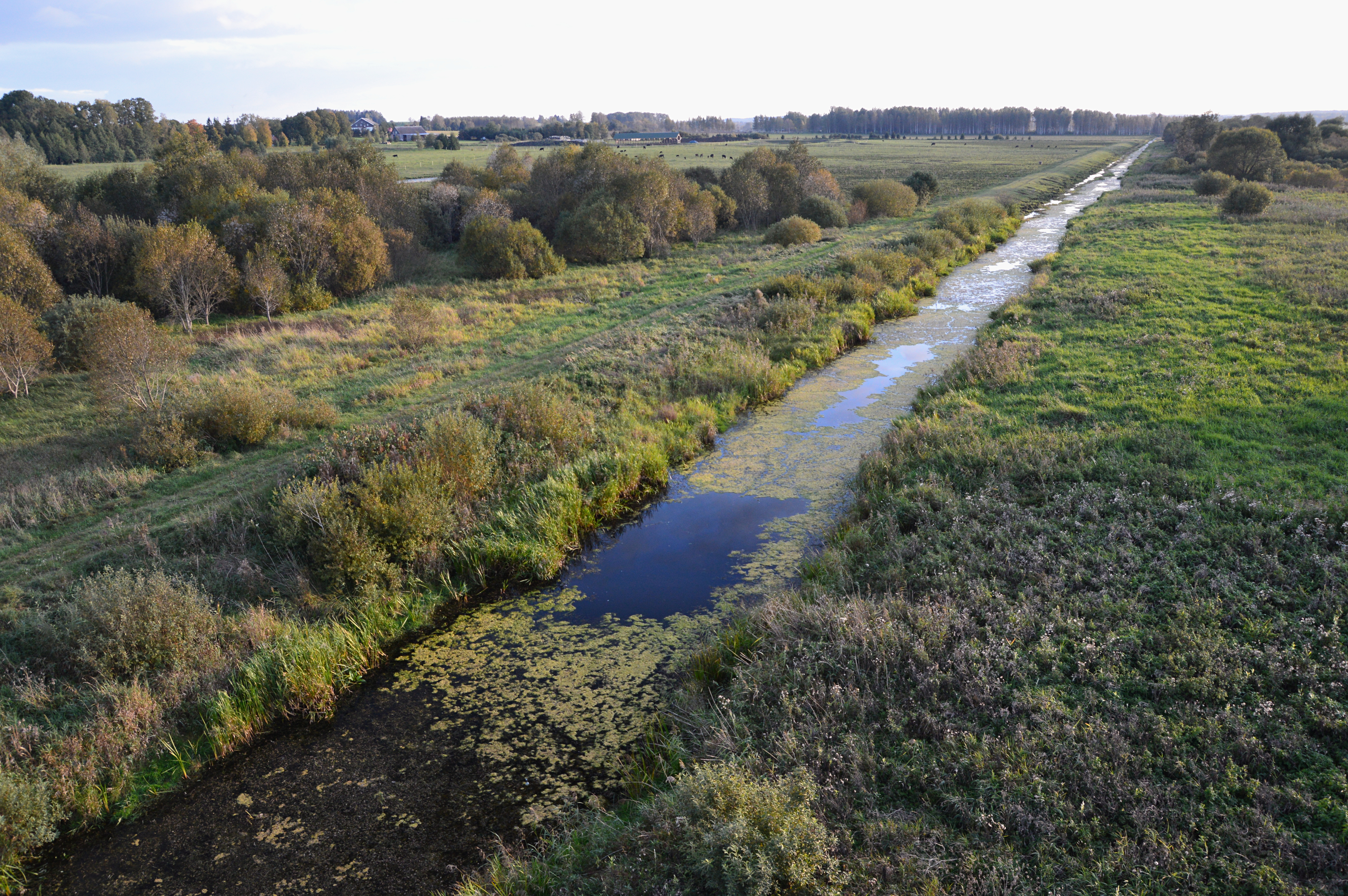

- Location within Estonia
- Location: Estonia
- Coordinates: 58°20′N 26°45′E
- Area: 791 ha (1,950 acres)
- Established: 1991 (2014)

Ropka-Ihaste Nature Reserve is a nature reserve which is located in Tartu County, Estonia.

The area of the nature reserve is 791 ha.

The protected area was founded in 1991 to protect Aardla Lake and its surrounding areas. In 2014 the protected area was designated to the nature reserve.
