= Kuulmajärv Landscape Conservation Area =

Protected area in Estonia

- Location within Estonia
- Location: Estonia
- Coordinates: 57°58′N 27°10′E
- Area: 1,016 ha (2,510 acres)
- Established: 1983 (2005)

Kuulmajärv Landscape Conservation Area (Estonian: Kuulmajärve maastikukaitseala) is a nature park in Põlva County, Estonia.

Its area is 1016 ha.

The protected area was designated in 1983 to protect Koolma Lake and its surrounding areas. In 2005, the protected area was redesigned to the landscape conservation area.
