= Andsu Lakes Landscape Conservation Area =

Protected area in Estonia

- Location within Estonia
- Location: Estonia
- Coordinates: 57°48′N 27°01′E
- Area: 51 hectares (130 acres)
- Established: 1962 (2019)

Andsu Lakes Landscape Conservation Area is a nature park situated in Võru County, Estonia.

Its area is 51 hectares (130 acres).

The protected area was designated in 1962 to protect Andsu lakes and theirs surrounding areas. In 2019, the protected area was redesigned to the landscape conservation area.
