= Jalase Landscape Conservation Area =

Protected area in Estonia

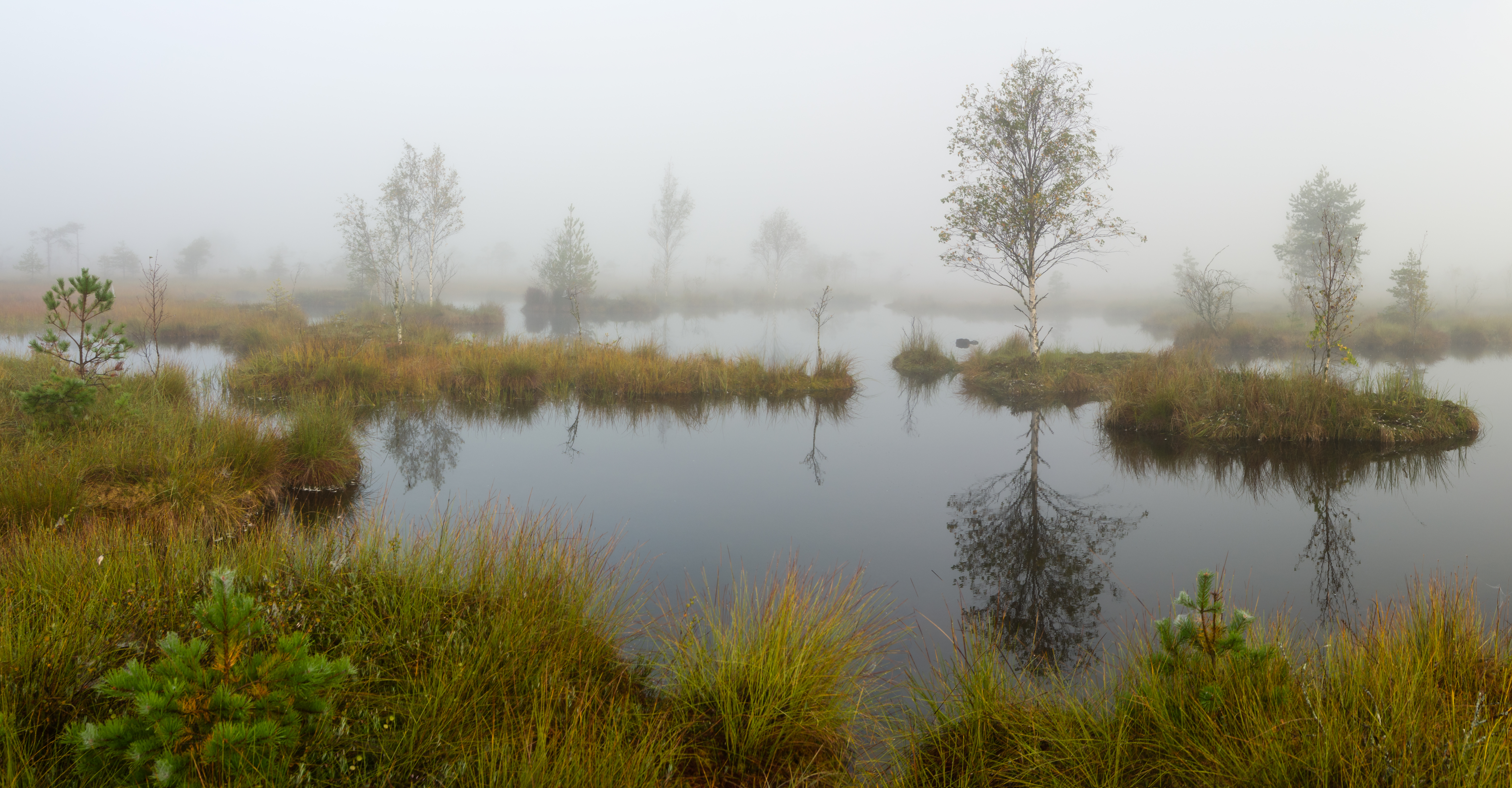

- Location within Estonia
- Location: Estonia
- Coordinates: 58°59′N 24°36′E
- Area: 2,720 ha (6,700 acres)
- Established: 1937 (2018)

Jalase Landscape Conservation Area is a nature park situated in Rapla County, Estonia.

Its area is 2720 ha.

The protected area was designated in 1937 to protect Lipstu Heath (Estonian: Lipstu nõmm). In 1964, also Jalase Lake was taken under protection. In 2003, the protected area was redesigned to the landscape conservation area.
