= Ainja Landscape Conservation Area =

Protected area in Estonia

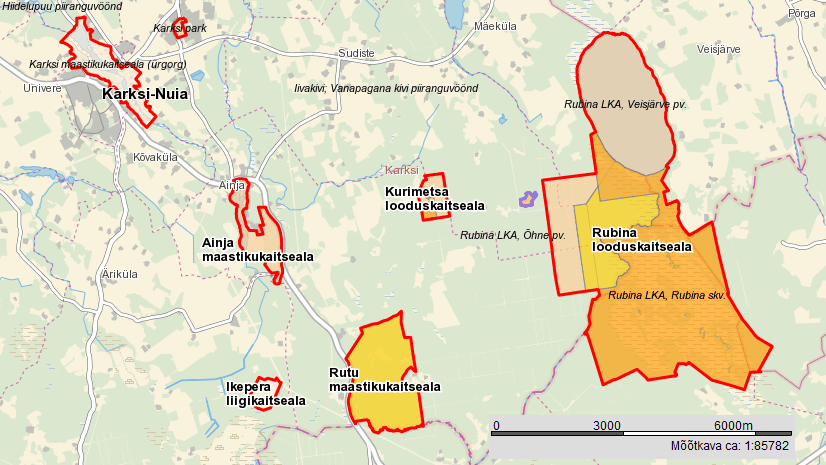

- Location within Estonia
- Location: Estonia
- Coordinates: 58°04′N 25°37′E
- Area: 112 ha (280 acres)
- Established: 1964 (2019)

Ainja Landscape Conservation Area is a nature park situated in Viljandi County, Estonia.

Its area is 112 ha.

The protected area was designated in 1964 to protect Ainja Sinejärv and its surrounding areas. In 2019, the protected area was redesigned to the landscape conservation area.
