= Tikste Landscape Conservation Area =

Protected area in Estonia

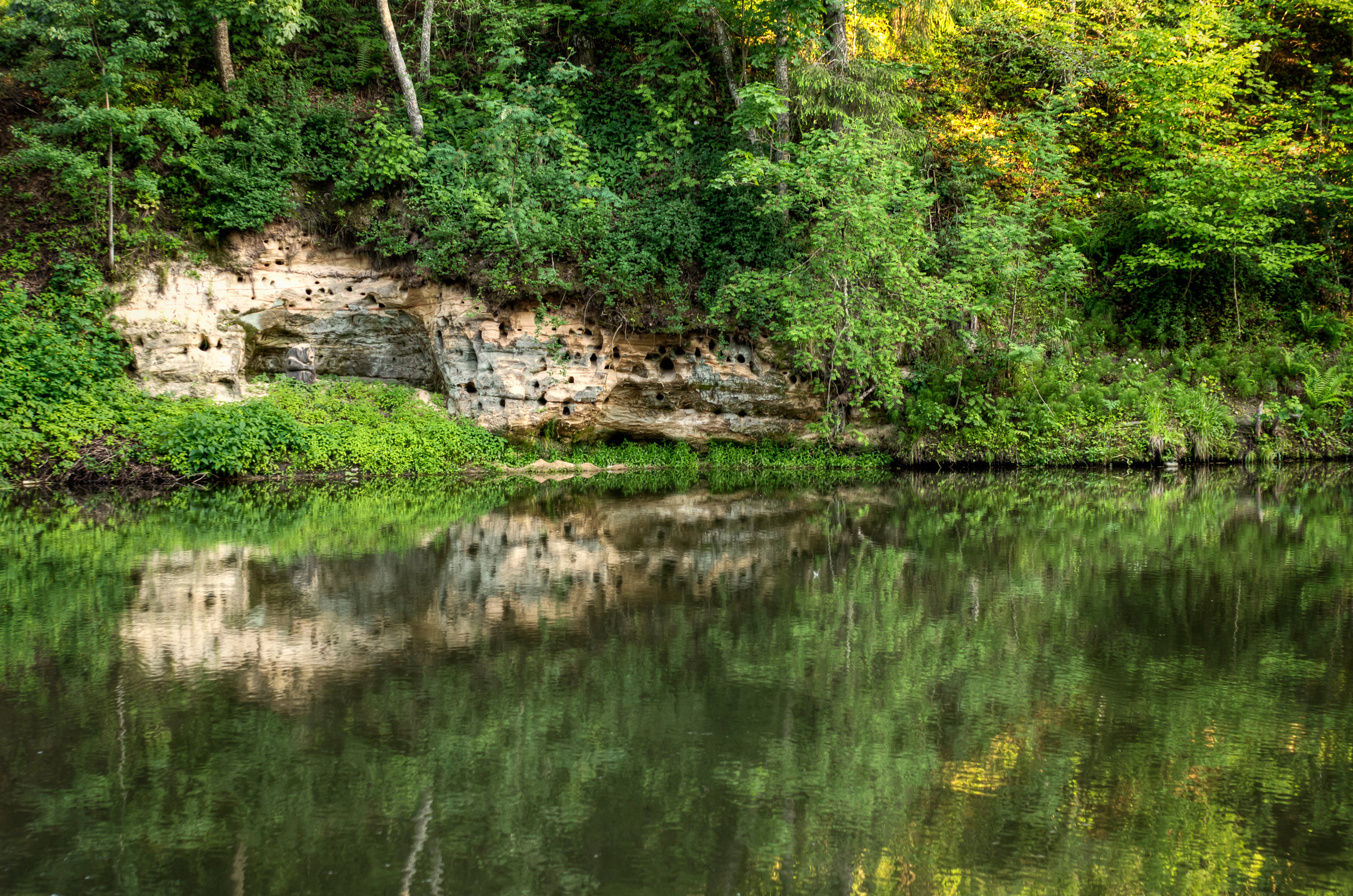

- Location within Estonia
- Location: Estonia
- Coordinates: 58°00′00″N 25°54′10″E
- Area: 38 ha (94 acres)
- Established: 1964 (2016)

Tikste Landscape Conservation Area is a nature park which is located in Valga County, Estonia.

The area of the nature park is 38 ha.

The protected area was founded in 1964 to protect Tikste Valley and Tikste Lake. In 2005, the protected area was designated to the landscape conservation area.
