= Lake Jaala =

Lake in Estonia

- Jaala järv (Estonian)
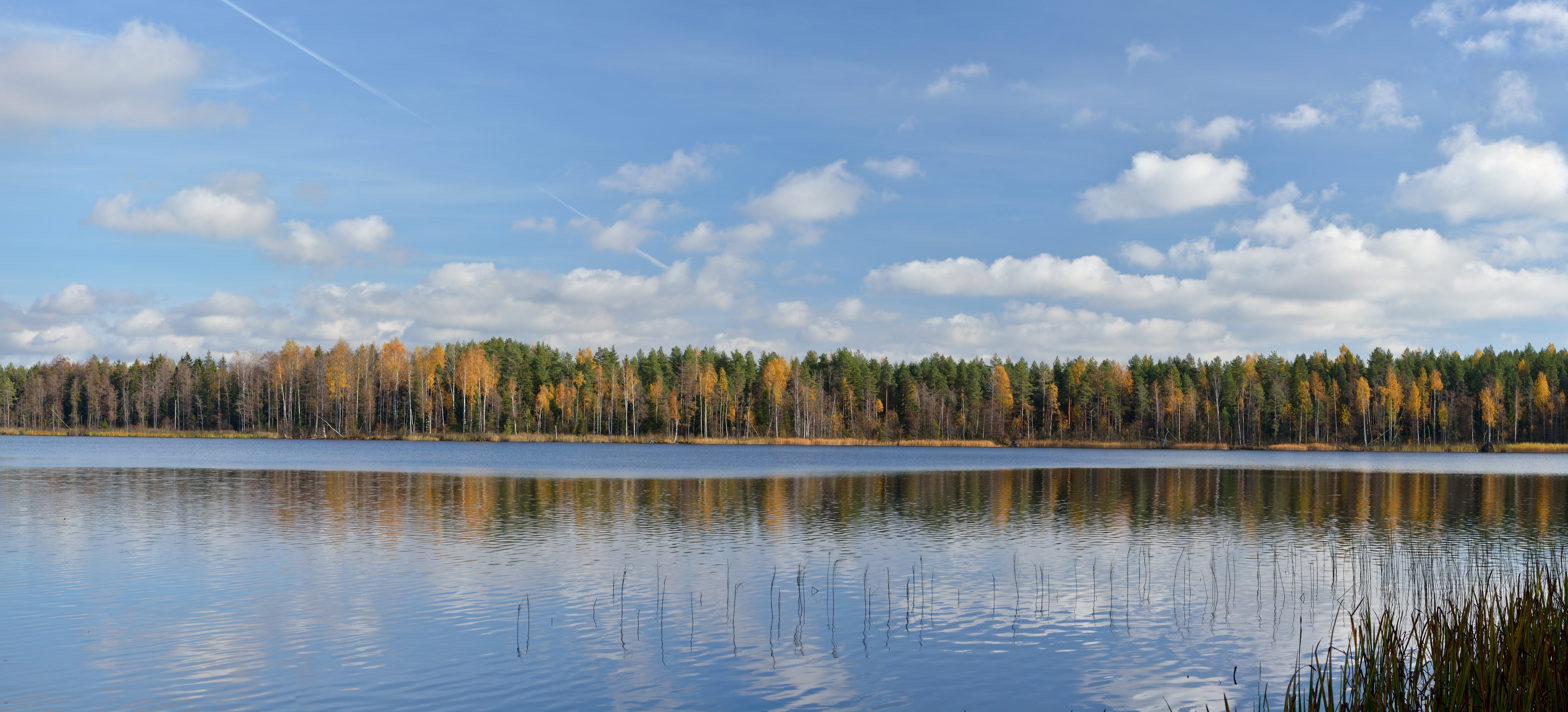

- Location within Estonia
- Location: Alutaguse Parish, Estonia
- Coordinates: 59°15′45″N 27°35′0″E
- Basin countries: Estonia
- Max. length: 750 meters (2,460 ft)
- Max. width: 460 meters (1,510 ft)
- Surface area: 19.5 hectares (48 acres)
- Average depth: 4.5 meters (15 ft)
- Max. depth: 6.3 meters (21 ft)
- Water volume: 887,000 cubic meters (31,300,000 cu ft)
- Shore length^{1}: 1,920 meters (6,300 ft)
- Surface elevation: 42.2 meters (138 ft)
- ^{1} Shore length is not a well-defined measure.

Lake Jaala (Estonian: Jaala järv, also Jala järv) is a lake in Estonia. It is located in the village of Konsu in Alutaguse Parish, Ida-Viru County.

== Physical description ==
The lake has an area of 19.5 hectares (48 acres). The lake has an average depth of 4.5 meters (15 ft) and a maximum depth of 6.3 meters (21 ft). It is 750 meters (2,460 ft) long, and its shoreline measures 1,920 meters (6,300 ft). It has a volume of 887,000 cubic meters (31,300,000 cu ft).

== See also ==
- List of lakes of Estonia
