= Lake Räätsma =

Lake in Ida-Viru County, Estonia

- Räätsma järv (Estonian)
- Location within Estonia
- Coordinates: 59°14′20″N 27°33′14″E
- Basin countries: Estonia
- Max. length: 1,210 meters (3,970 ft)
- Surface area: 15.8 hectares (39 acres)
- Average depth: 4.6 meters (15 ft)
- Max. depth: 10.5 meters (34 ft)
- Water volume: 726,000 cubic meters (25,600,000 cu ft)
- Shore length^{1}: 2,840 meters (9,320 ft)
- Surface elevation: 45.1 meters (148 ft)
- ^{1} Shore length is not a well-defined measure.

Lake Räätsma (Estonian: Räätsma järv, also known as Räästma järv) is a lake in northeastern Estonia. It is located in the village of Konsu in Alutaguse Parish, Ida-Viru County.

== Physical description ==
The lake has an area of 15.8 hectares (39 acres). The lake has an average depth of 4.6 meters (15 ft) and a maximum depth of 10.5 meters (34 ft). It is 1,210 meters (3,970 ft) long, and its shoreline measures 2,840 meters (9,320 ft). It has a volume of 726,000 cubic meters (25,600,000 cu ft).

== See also ==
- List of lakes of Estonia
