= Karujärv =

Lake in Estonia

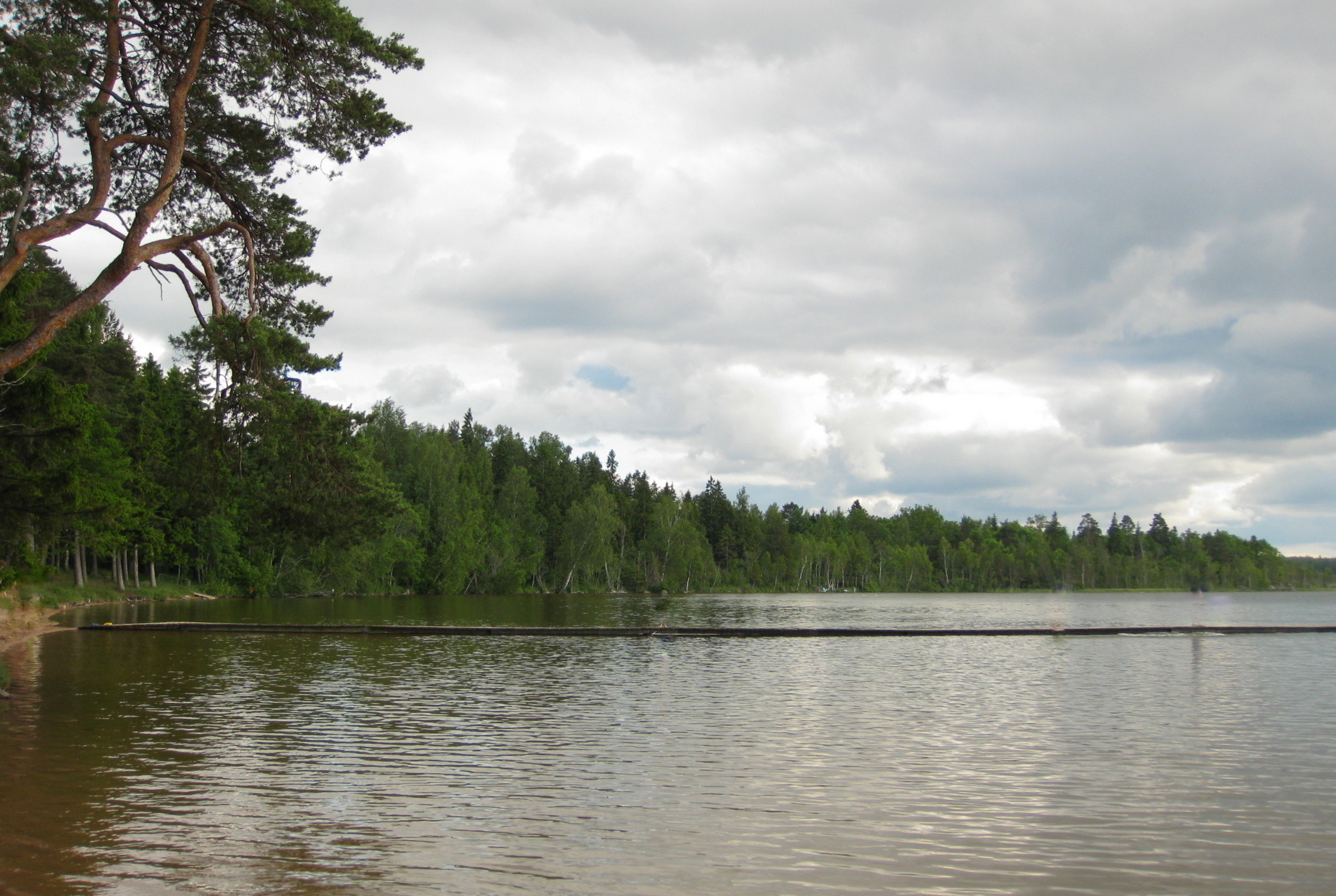

- Location within Estonia
- Location: Lääne-Saare Parish, Saare County
- Coordinates: 58°23′N 22°13′E
- Basin countries: Estonia
- Max. length: 2,970 meters (9,740 ft)
- Surface area: 348.2 hectares (860 acres)
- Average depth: 2.1 meters (6 ft 11 in)
- Max. depth: 7.0 meters (23.0 ft)
- Water volume: 7,473,000 cubic meters (263,900,000 cu ft)
- Shore length^{1}: 12,930 meters (42,420 ft)
- Surface elevation: 32.8 meters (108 ft)
- Islands: 3
- ^{1} Shore length is not a well-defined measure.

Karujärv (literally, 'bear lake'; also Järumetsa järv or Järvemetsa järv) is a lake in Estonia. It is located in the village of Paiküla in Saaremaa Parish, Saare County.

== Physical description ==
The lake has an area of 348.2 hectares (860 acres), and it has three islands with a combined area of 3.9 hectares (9.6 acres). The lake has an average depth of 2.1 meters (6 ft 11 in) and a maximum depth of 7.0 meters (23.0 ft). It is 2,970 meters (9,740 ft) long, and its shoreline measures 12,930 meters (42,420 ft). It has a volume of 7,473,000 cubic meters (263,900,000 cu ft).

== See also ==
- List of lakes of Estonia
