= Ansiauk =

Lake in Estonia

- Location within Estonia
- Coordinates: 58.3131°N 21.9722°E
- Basin countries: Estonia
- Max. length: 190 meters (620 ft)
- Surface area: 0.8 hectares (2.0 acres)
- Average depth: 0.7 meters (2 ft 4 in)
- Shore length^{1}: 600 meters (2,000 ft)
- Surface elevation: 3.0 meters (9.8 ft)
- ^{1} Shore length is not a well-defined measure.

Ansiauk is a lake in Estonia. It is located in the village of Kuusnõmme in Saaremaa Parish, Saare County.

== Physical description ==
The lake has an area of 0.8 hectares (2.0 acres). The lake has a maximum depth of 0.7 meters (2 ft 4 in). It is 190 meters (620 ft) long, and its shoreline measures 600 meters (2,000 ft).

== See also ==
- List of lakes of Estonia
