= Kurgjärv =

Lake in Estonia

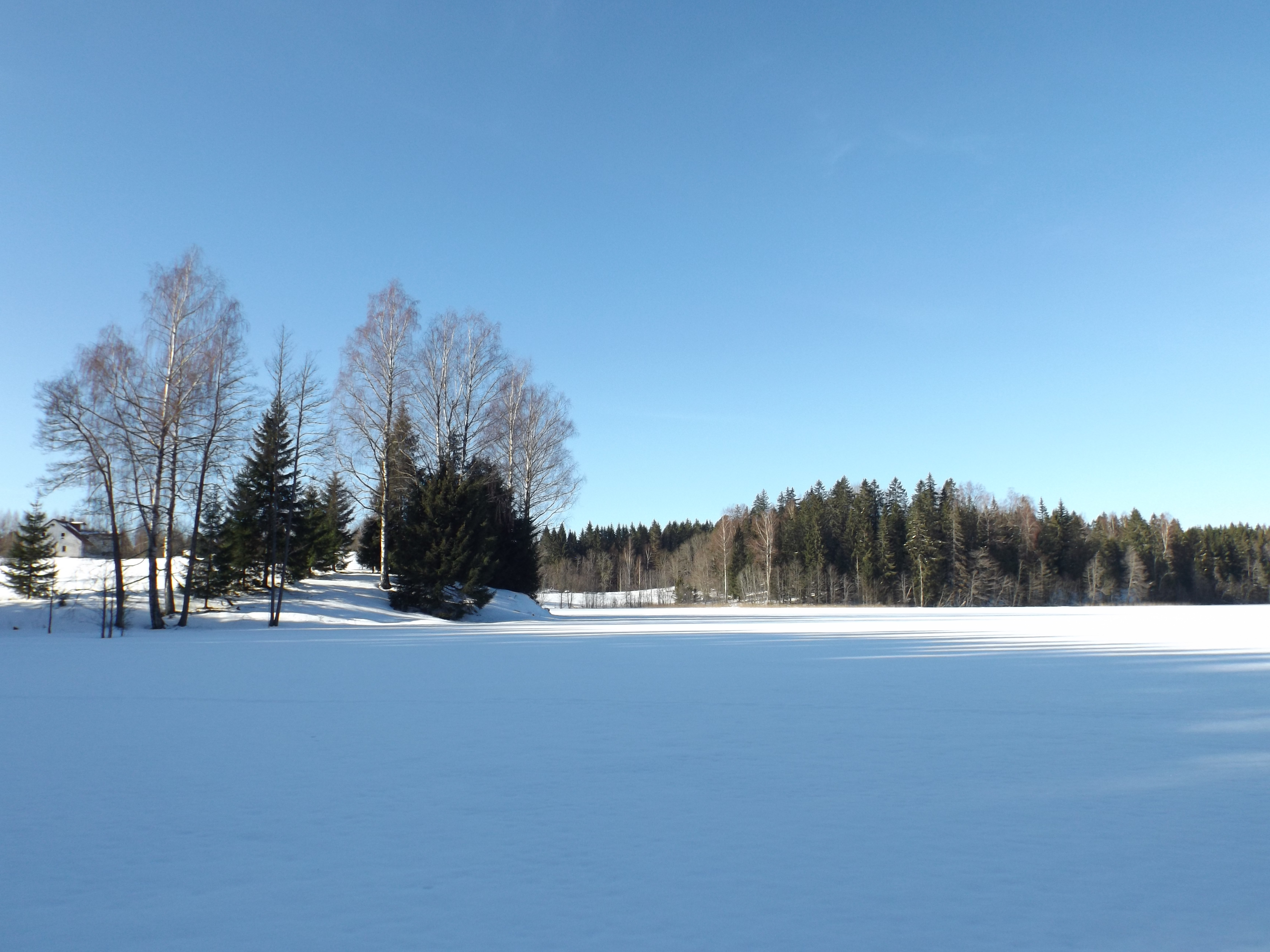
- Kurgjärv covered in ice

- Location within Estonia
- Coordinates: 57°43′N 27°01′E
- Basin countries: Estonia
- Max. length: 650 meters (2,130 ft)
- Surface area: 12.3 hectares (30 acres)}
- Average depth: 3.9 meters (13 ft)
- Max. depth: 8.5 meters (28 ft)
- Water volume: 387,000 cubic meters (13,700,000 cu ft)
- Shore length^{1}: 1,970 meters (6,460 ft)
- Surface elevation: 232.2 meters (762 ft)
- ^{1} Shore length is not a well-defined measure.

Kurgjärv is a lake in Estonia. It is located in the village of Kurgjärve in Rõuge Parish, Võru County.

== Physical description ==
The lake has an area of 12.3 hectares (30 acres)}. The lake has an average depth of 3.9 meters (13 ft) and a maximum depth of 8.5 meters (28 ft). It is 650 meters (2,130 ft) long, and its shoreline measures 1,970 meters (6,460 ft). It has a volume of 387,000 cubic meters (13,700,000 cu ft).

== See also ==
- List of lakes of Estonia
