= Kärnjärv =

Lake in Estonia

- Location within Estonia
- Coordinates: 57°54′N 27°10′E
- Basin countries: Estonia
- Max. length: 490 meters (1,610 ft)
- Surface area: 7.9 hectares (20 acres)
- Average depth: 8.7 meters (29 ft)
- Max. depth: 26.0 meters (85.3 ft)
- Shore length^{1}: 1,160 meters (3,810 ft)
- Surface elevation: 68.8 meters (226 ft)
- ^{1} Shore length is not a well-defined measure.

Kärnjärv (also Pindi Kärnjärv) is a lake in Estonia. It is located in the village of Paidra in Võru Parish, Võru County.

== Physical description ==
The lake has an area of 7.9 hectares (20 acres). The lake has an average depth of 8.7 meters (29 ft) and a maximum depth of 26.0 meters (85.3 ft). It is 490 meters (1,610 ft) long, and its shoreline measures 1,160 meters (3,810 ft).

== See also ==
- List of lakes of Estonia
