= Ahtriskeloik =

Lake in Estonia

- Location within Estonia
- Coordinates: 58°15′39″N 21°53′13″E
- Basin countries: Estonia
- Max. length: 470 meters (1,540 ft)
- Surface area: 4.2 hectares (10 acres)
- Shore length^{1}: 1,250 meters (4,100 ft)
- Surface elevation: 0.4 meters (1 ft 4 in)
- ^{1} Shore length is not a well-defined measure.

Ahtriskeloik (also Adriska järv or Kõve lõugas) is a lake in Estonia. It is located in the village of Karala in Saare County.

== Physical description ==
The lake has an area of 4.2 hectares (10 acres). It is 470 meters (1,540 ft) long, and its shoreline measures 1,250 meters (4,100 ft).

== See also ==
- List of lakes of Estonia
