= Lake Palujüri =

Lake in Estonia

- Palujüri järv (Estonian)
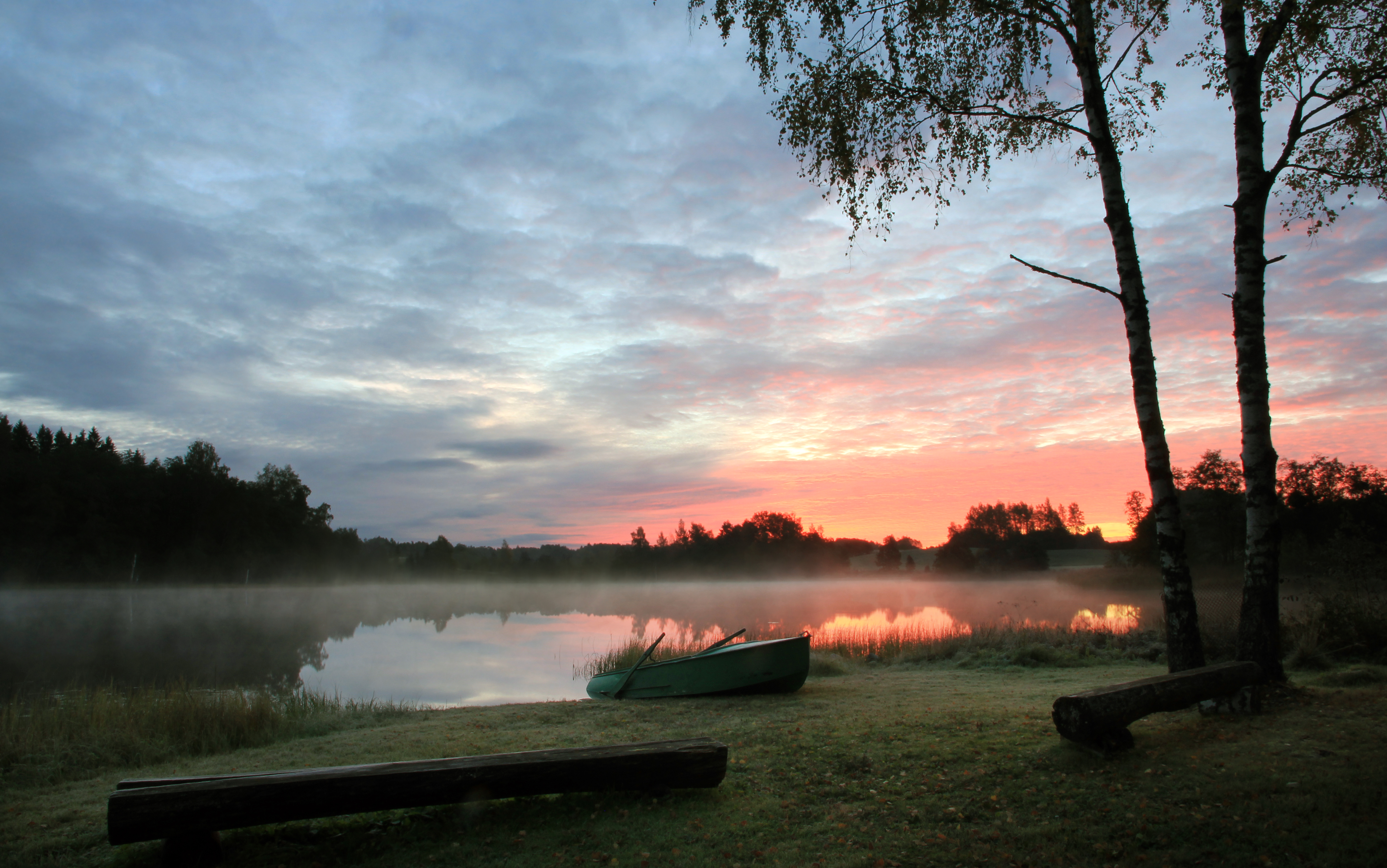
- Lake Palujüri in 2013

- Location within Estonia
- Coordinates: 57.6517°N 27.0356°E
- Basin countries: Estonia
- Max. length: 470 meters (1,540 ft)
- Surface area: 7.6 hectares (19 acres)
- Average depth: 4.2 meters (14 ft)
- Max. depth: 15.1 meters (50 ft)
- Shore length^{1}: 1,250 meters (4,100 ft)
- Surface elevation: 215.7 meters (708 ft)
- ^{1} Shore length is not a well-defined measure.

Lake Palujüri is a lake in Estonia. It is located in the village of Palujüri in Rõuge Parish, Võru County.

== Physical description ==
The lake has an area of 7.6 hectares (19 acres). The lake has an average depth of 4.2 meters (14 ft) and a maximum depth of 15.1 meters (50 ft). It is 470 meters (1,540 ft) long, and its shoreline measures 1,250 meters (4,100 ft).

== See also ==
- List of lakes of Estonia
