= Mäejärv (Väimela) =

Lake in Estonia

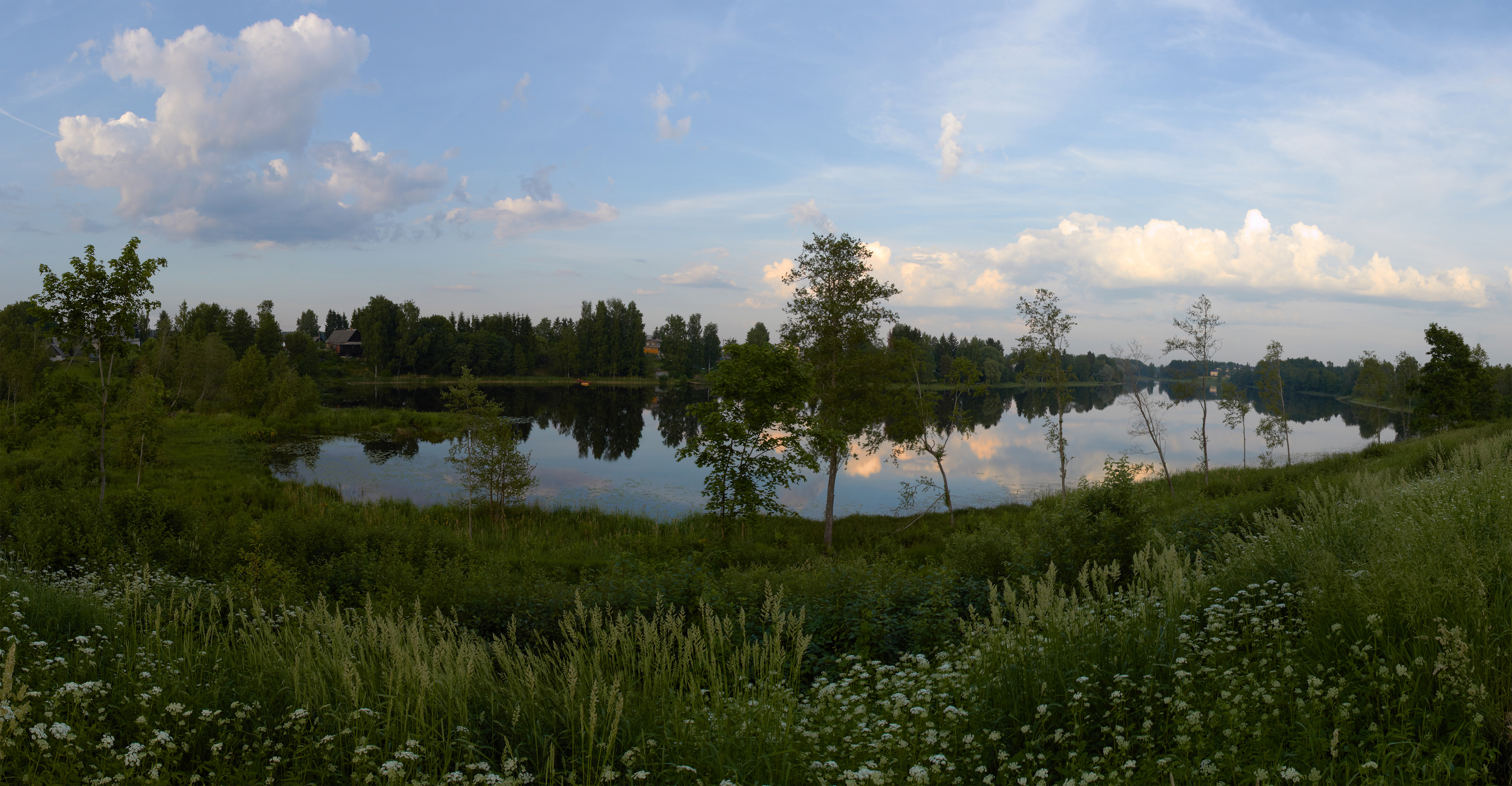

- Location within Estonia
- Location: Võru County
- Coordinates: 57°53′40″N 27°00′17″E
- Basin countries: Estonia
- Max. length: 900 meters (3,000 ft)
- Surface area: 14.0 hectares (35 acres)
- Average depth: 4.9 meters (16 ft)
- Max. depth: 11.6 meters (38 ft)
- Water volume: 666,000 cubic meters (23,500,000 cu ft)
- Shore length^{1}: 2,190 meters (7,190 ft)
- Surface elevation: 73.2 meters (240 ft)
- Islands: 1
- ^{1} Shore length is not a well-defined measure.

Mäejärv (also known as Väimela Mäejärv, Suur Väimela järv, or Väimela Ülajärv) is a lake in Estonia. It is located in the settlement of Väimela in Võru Parish, Võru County.

== Physical description ==
The lake has an area of 14.0 hectares (35 acres), and it has an island with an area of 0.003 hectares (0.0074 acres). The lake has an average depth of 4.9 meters (16 ft) and a maximum depth of 11.6 meters (38 ft). It is 900 meters (3,000 ft) long, and its shoreline measures 2,190 meters (7,190 ft). It has a volume of 666,000 cubic meters (23,500,000 cu ft).

== See also ==
- List of lakes of Estonia
