= Kõvvõrjärv =

Lake in Estonia

- Location within Estonia
- Coordinates: 57°43′48″N 27°02′06″E
- Basin countries: Estonia
- Max. length: 250 meters (820 ft)
- Surface area: 1.5 hectares (3.7 acres)
- Average depth: 2.4 meters (7 ft 10 in)
- Max. depth: 4.8 meters (16 ft)
- Shore length^{1}: 700 meters (2,300 ft)
- Surface elevation: 222.3 meters (729 ft)
- ^{1} Shore length is not a well-defined measure.

Kõvvõrjärv (also Tsiamäe Kõvvõrjärv, Haanja Kõverjärv, or Suur Tseamäe järv) is a lake in Estonia. It is located in the village of Tsiamäe in Rõuge Parish, Võru County.

== Physical description ==
The lake has an area of 1.5 hectares (3.7 acres). The lake has an average depth of 2.4 meters (7 ft 10 in) and a maximum depth of 4.8 meters (16 ft). It is 250 meters (820 ft) long, and its shoreline measures 700 meters (2,300 ft).

== See also ==
- List of lakes of Estonia
