= Aastejärv =

Lake in Estonia

- Aastajärv
- Location within Estonia
- Coordinates: 58°30′22″N 21°55′48″E
- Basin countries: Estonia
- Max. length: 510 meters (1,670 ft)
- Max. depth: 1 meter (3 ft 3 in)
- Shore length^{1}: 1,750 meters (5,740 ft)
- Surface elevation: 4.9 meters (16 ft)
- Islands: 2
- ^{1} Shore length is not a well-defined measure.

Aastejärv (also Aastajärv) is a lake in Estonia. It is located in the village of Neeme in Saaremaa Parish, Saare County.

== Physical description ==
The lake has an area of 10.6 hectares (26 acres), and it has two islands with a combined area of 0.3 hectares (0.74 acres). The lake has a maximum depth of 1 meter (3 ft 3 in). It is 510 meters (1,670 ft) long, and its shoreline measures 1,750 meters (5,740 ft).

== See also ==
- List of lakes in Estonia
