= Lake Keeri =

Lake in Estonia

- Keeri järv (Estonian)
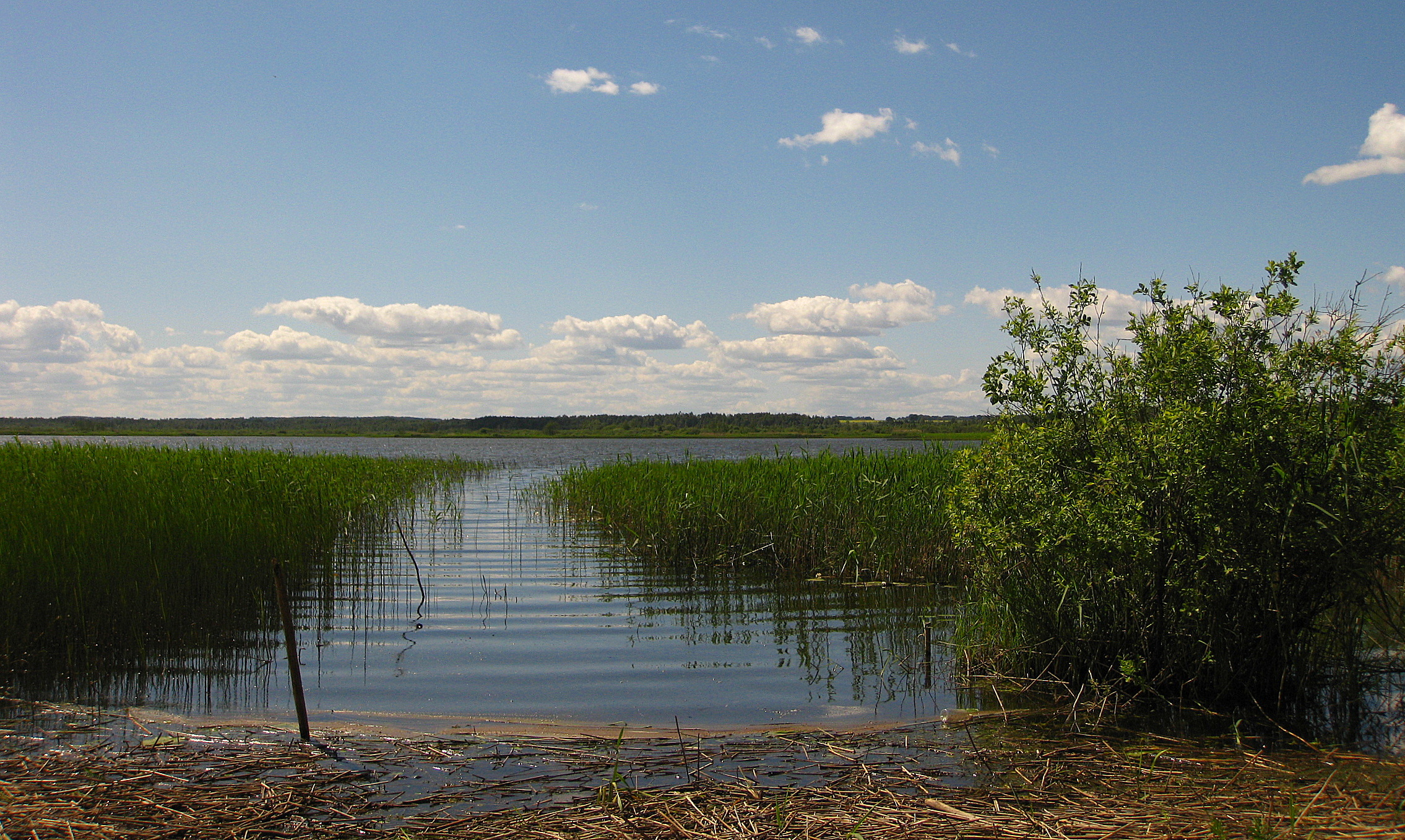

- Location within Estonia
- Coordinates: 58°19′37″N 26°27′31″E
- Basin countries: Estonia
- Max. length: 2,300 meters (7,500 ft)
- Surface area: 134.4 hectares (332 acres)
- Average depth: 2.9 meters (9 ft 6 in)
- Max. depth: 4.5 meters (15 ft)
- Water volume: 4,288,000 cubic meters (151,400,000 cu ft)
- Shore length^{1}: 10,330 meters (33,890 ft)
- Surface elevation: 32.4 meters (106 ft)
- ^{1} Shore length is not a well-defined measure.

Lake Keeri (Estonian: Keeri järv, also Härjanurme järv, Keri järv, Keeri-Ulila järv, Ulila järv, or Võsivere järv) is a lake in Estonia. It is located in the village of Härjanurme in Elva Parish, Tartu County.

== Physical description ==
The lake has an area of 134.4 hectares (332 acres). The lake has an average depth of 2.9 meters (9 ft 6 in) and a maximum depth of 4.5 meters (15 ft). It is 2,300 meters (7,500 ft) long, and its shoreline measures 10,330 meters (33,890 ft). It has a volume of 4,288,000 cubic meters (151,400,000 cu ft).

== See also ==
- List of lakes of Estonia
