= Lake Karsna =

Lake in Estonia

- Karsna järv (Estonian)
- Location within Estonia
- Coordinates: 57°55′44″N 27°05′39″E
- Basin countries: Estonia
- Max. length: 620 meters (2,030 ft)
- Surface area: 17.2 hectares (43 acres)
- Average depth: 3.1 meters (10 ft)
- Max. depth: 8.1 meters (27 ft)
- Water volume: 505,000 cubic meters (17,800,000 cu ft)
- Shore length^{1}: 1,740 meters (5,710 ft)
- Surface elevation: 78.8 meters (259 ft)
- ^{1} Shore length is not a well-defined measure.

Lake Karsna (Estonian: Karsna järv) is a lake in Estonia. It is located in the village of Lauga in Võru Parish, Võru County.

== Physical description ==
The lake has an area of 17.2 hectares (43 acres). The lake has an average depth of 3.1 meters (10 ft) and a maximum depth of 8.1 meters (27 ft). It is 620 meters (2,030 ft) long, and its shoreline measures 1,740 meters (5,710 ft). It has a volume of 505,000 cubic meters (17,800,000 cu ft).

== See also ==
- List of lakes of Estonia
