= Lake Vaskna =

Lake in Estonia

- Vaskna järv (Estonian)
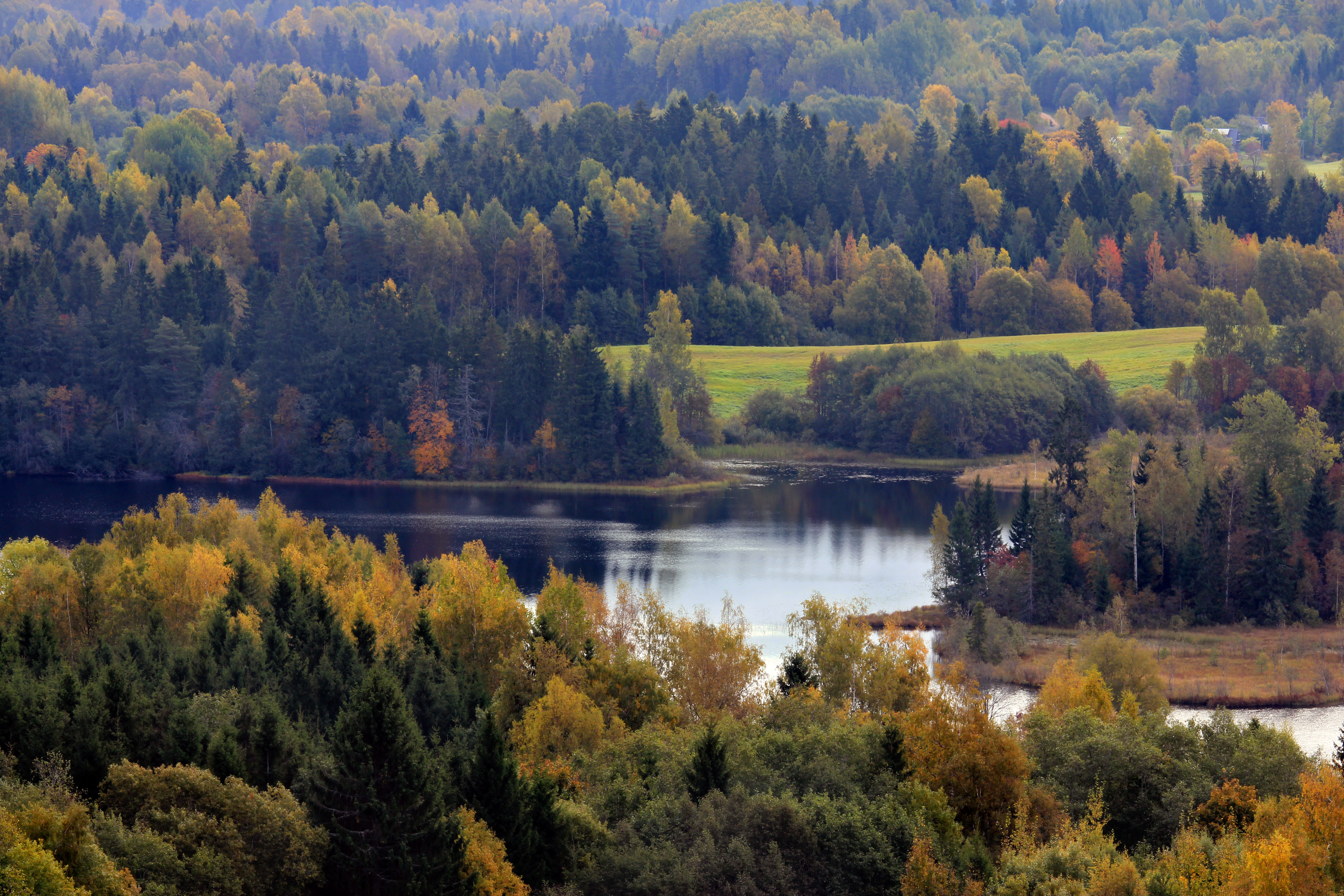

- Location within Estonia
- Coordinates: 57°42′36″N 27°04′40″E
- Basin countries: Estonia
- Max. length: 1,690 meters (5,540 ft)
- Surface area: 36.5 hectares (90 acres)
- Average depth: 2.8 meters (9 ft 2 in)
- Max. depth: 9.5 meters (31 ft)
- Water volume: 661,000 cubic meters (23,300,000 cu ft)
- Shore length^{1}: 7,820 meters (25,660 ft)
- Surface elevation: 243.1 meters (798 ft)
- Islands: 2
- ^{1} Shore length is not a well-defined measure.

Lake Vaskna (Estonian: Vaskna järv) is a lake in Estonia. It is located in the village of Trolla in Rõuge Parish, Võru County.

== Physical description ==
The lake has an area of 36.5 hectares (90 acres), and it has two islands with a combined area of 0.5 hectares (1.2 acres). The lake has an average depth of 2.8 meters (9 ft 2 in) and a maximum depth of 9.5 meters (31 ft). It is 1,690 meters (5,540 ft) long, and its shoreline measures 7,820 meters (25,660 ft). It has a volume of 661,000 cubic meters (23,300,000 cu ft).

== Gallery ==
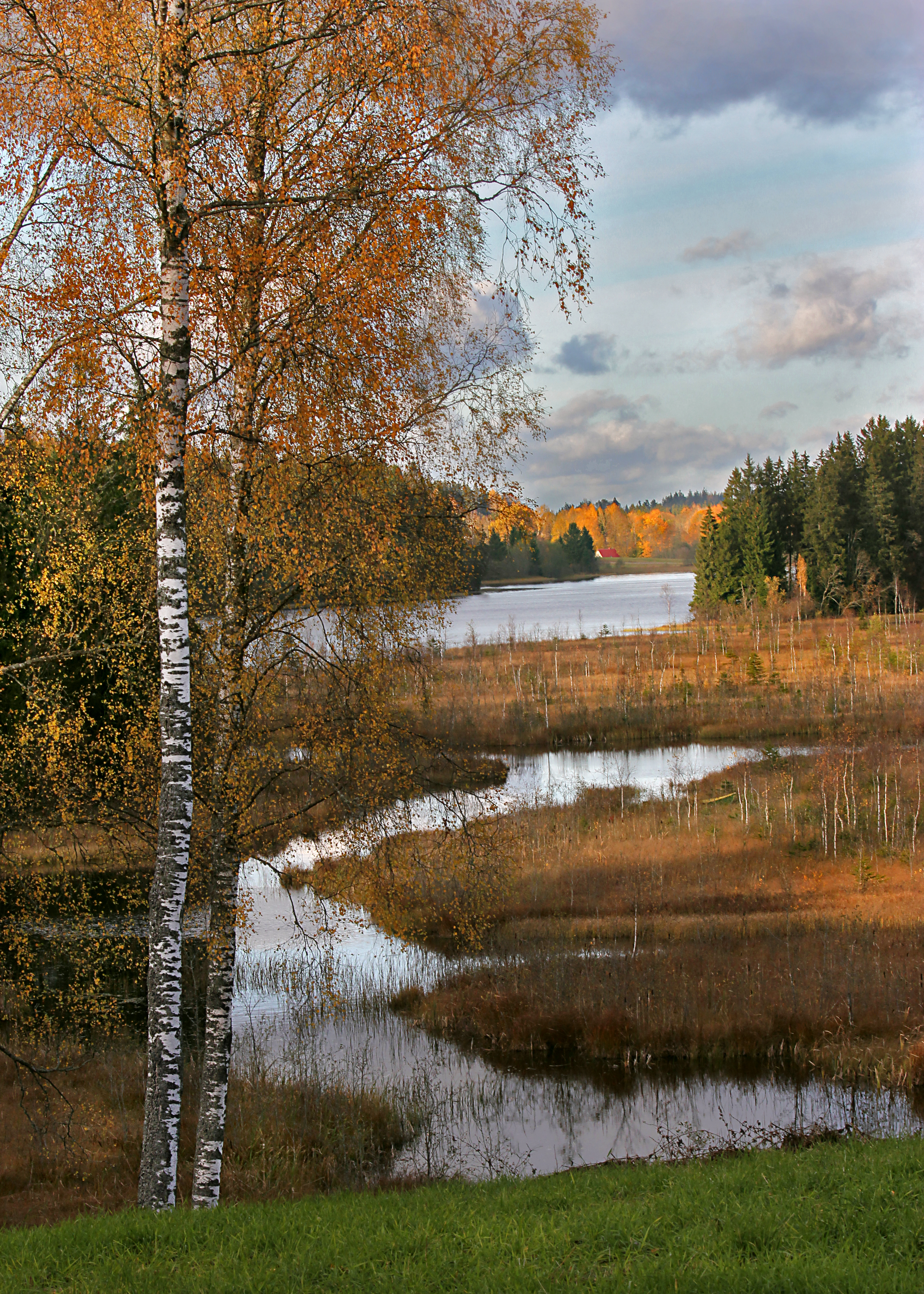
Lake Vaskna

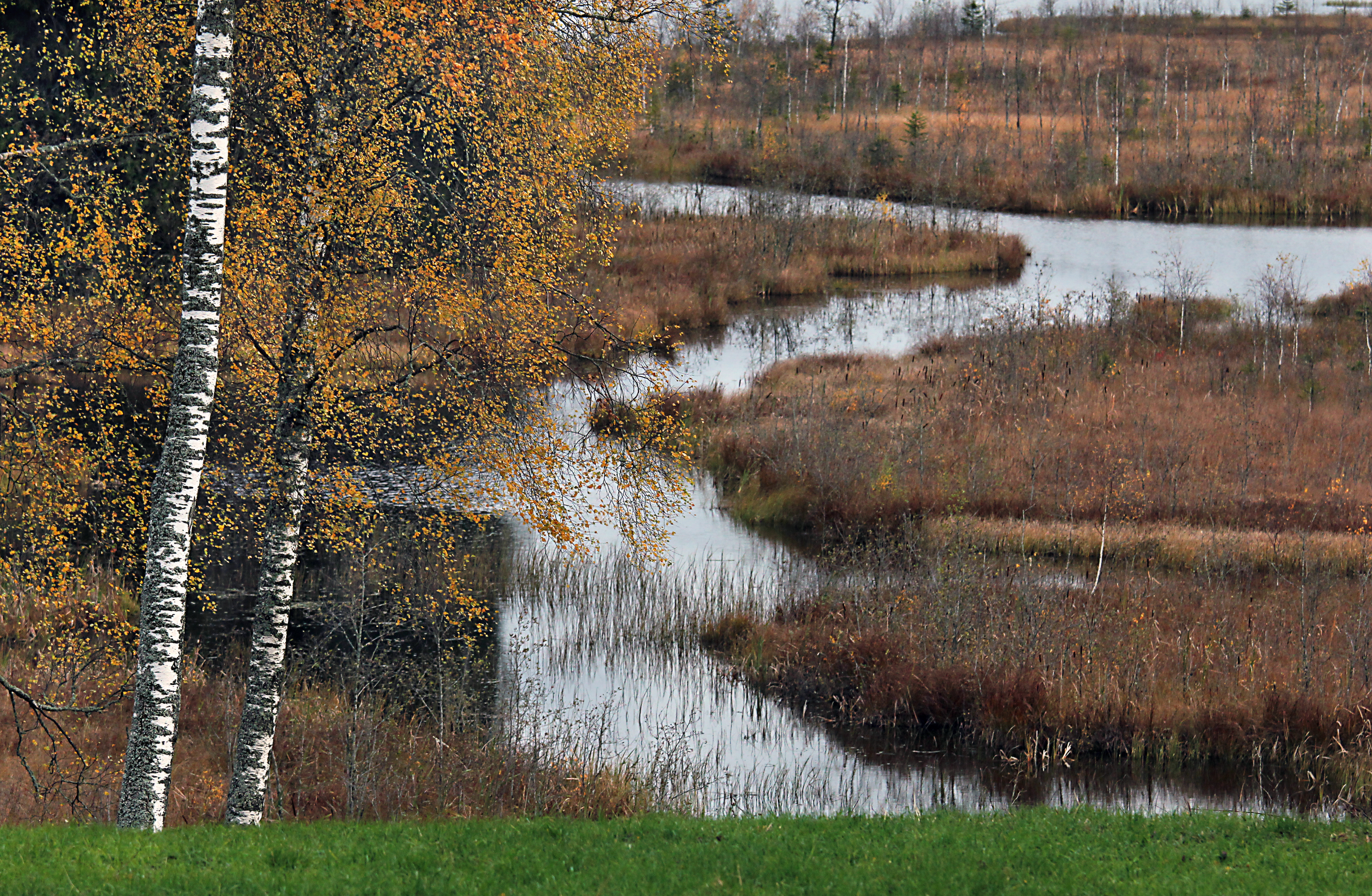
Lake Vaskna

== See also ==
- List of lakes of Estonia
