= Illi Lakes =

Lake in Estonia

- Location within Estonia
- Coordinates: 58°11′28″N 26°25′42″E
- Basin countries: Estonia

The Illi Lakes (Estonian: Illi järved) are two lakes in Illi, Tartu County, Estonia.

- Big Lake Illi (Estonian: Illi Suur Umbjärv, also Umbjärv, Illi Umbjärv, or Suur Umbjärv) is the larger of the two lakes. It has an area of 2.1 hectares (5.2 acres), is 200 meters (660 ft) long, and has a shoreline measuring 540 meters (1,770 ft). It lies at an elevation of 45.6 meters (150 ft).
- Little Lake Illi (Estonian: Illi Väike Umbjärv or Väike Umbjärv) is the smaller of the two lakes. It has an area of 1 hectare (2.5 acres), is 180 meters (590 ft) long, and has a shoreline measuring 420 meters (1,380 ft). It lies at an elevation of 45.8 meters (150 ft).

== See also ==
- List of lakes of Estonia
