= Võngjärv =

Lake in Estonia

- Location within Estonia
- Coordinates: 58°20′N 27°09′E
- Basin countries: Estonia
- Max. length: 860 meters (2,820 ft)
- Surface area: 20.8 hectares (51 acres)
- Average depth: 2.0 meters (6 ft 7 in)
- Max. depth: 2.5 meters (8 ft 2 in)
- Shore length^{1}: 2,230 meters (7,320 ft)
- Surface elevation: 30.2 meters (99 ft)
- ^{1} Shore length is not a well-defined measure.

Võngjärv is a lake in Estonia. It is located in the village of Lääniste in Kastre Parish, Tartu County.

== Physical description ==
The lake has an area of 20.8 hectares (51 acres). The lake has an average depth of 2.0 meters (6 ft 7 in) and a maximum depth of 2.5 meters (8 ft 2 in). It is 860 meters (2,820 ft) long, and its shoreline measures 2,230 meters (7,320 ft).

== See also ==
- List of lakes of Estonia
