= Paide Reservoir =

Lake in Estonia

- Paide tehisjärv (Estonian)
- Location within Estonia
- Location: Paide
- Coordinates: 58.8846238°N 25.5842555°E
- Basin countries: Estonia
- Max. length: 360 meters (1,180 ft)
- Surface area: 4.4 hectares (11 acres)
- Average depth: 1.9 meters (6 ft 3 in)
- Water volume: 80,000 cubic meters (2,800,000 cu ft)
- Shore length^{1}: 930 meters (3,050 ft)
- Surface elevation: 61 meters (200 ft)
- ^{1} Shore length is not a well-defined measure.

The Paide Reservoir (Estonian: Paide tehisjärv, also Kirila veehoidla or Mündi paisjärv) is a lake in Estonia. It is located in the village of Kriilevälja in Järva County.

== Physical description ==
The lake has an area of 4.4 hectares (11 acres). The lake has an average depth of 1.9 meters (6 ft 3 in). It is 360 meters (1,180 ft) long, and its shoreline measures 930 meters (3,050 ft). It has a volume of 80,000 cubic meters (2,800,000 cu ft).

== See also ==
- List of lakes of Estonia
