= Little Lake Palkna =

Lake in Estonia

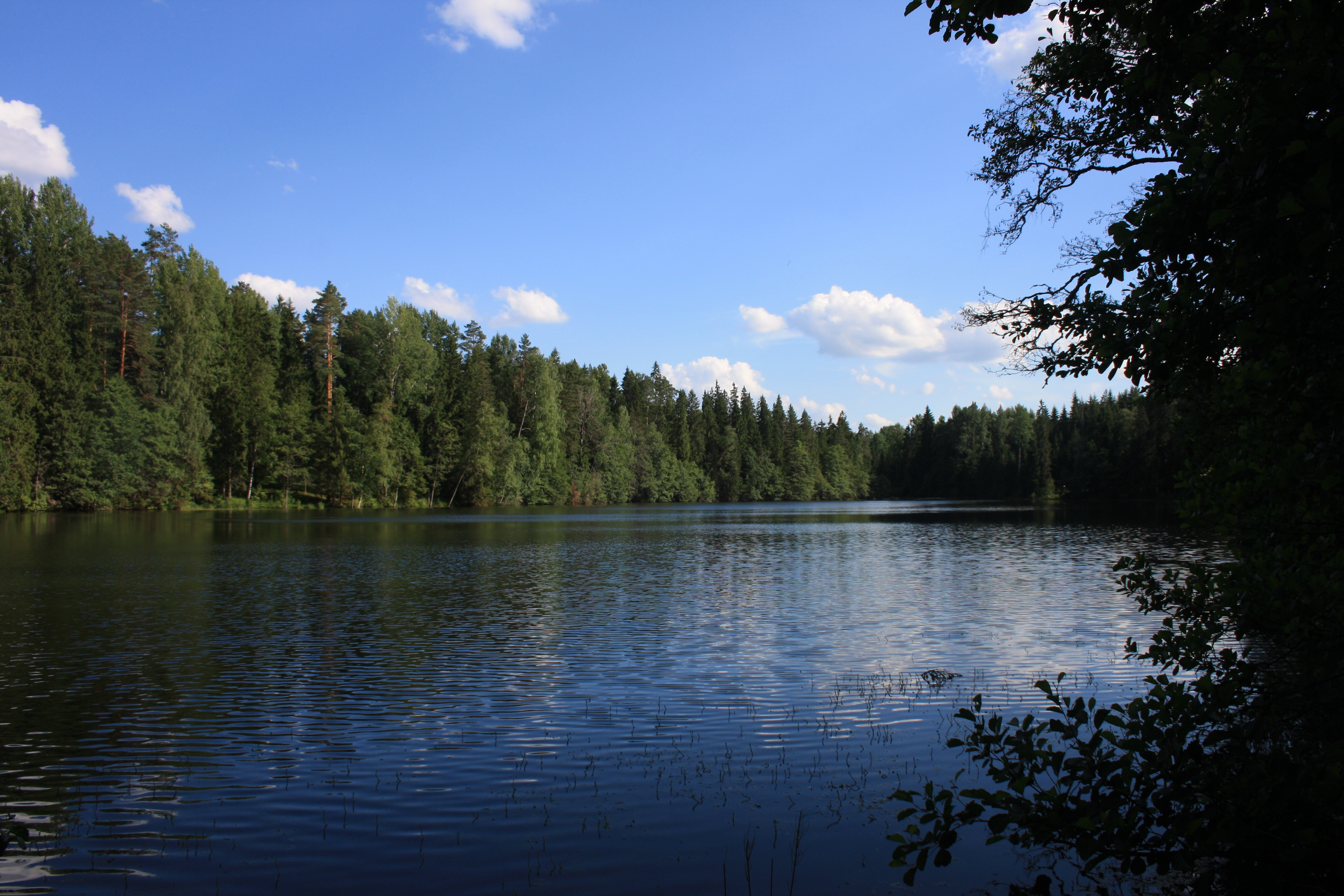

- Location within Estonia
- Location: Haanja Parish, Võru County, Estonia, and Latvia
- Coordinates: 57.6067°N 26.9714°E
- Basin countries: Estonia
- Surface area: 4.8 ha (12 acres)
- Average depth: 14.0 m (45.9 ft)
- Max. depth: 31.9 m (105 ft)

Little Lake Palkna (Estonian: Väiku-Palkna järv) or Little Lake Baltiņš Latvian: Mazais Baltiņš) is a boundary lake between Estonia (Haanja Parish, Võru County) and Latvia.

The area of the lake is 4.8 ha (12 acres) and its maximum depth is 31.9 m (105 ft) (second in Estonia). The lake's average depth is 14.0 m (45.9 ft), first in Estonia in terms of average depth.

The lake is part of the eight Korneti Lakes, a chain of lakes near the Latvian–Estonian border. Semantically, Little Lake Palkna is paired with Big Lake Palkna (Estonian: Suur-Palkna järv) or Big Lake Baltiņš (Latvian: Lielais Baltiņš), which lies about 700 meters (2,300 ft) to the southwest.

== See also ==
- List of lakes of Estonia
