= Lake Sõmerpalu =

Lake in Estonia

- Sõmerpalu järv (Estonian)
- Location within Estonia
- Location: Sõmerpalu Parish, Voru County
- Coordinates: 57°51′29″N 26°49′04″E
- Catchment area: 3.5 square kilometers (1.4 sq mi)
- Basin countries: Estonia
- Max. length: 830 meters (2,720 ft)
- Max. width: 550 meters (1,800 ft)
- Surface area: 10.3 hectares (25 acres)
- Max. depth: 2.0 meters (6 ft 7 in)
- Shore length^{1}: 3,340 meters (10,960 ft)
- Surface elevation: 77.8 meters (255 ft)
- ^{1} Shore length is not a well-defined measure.

Lake Sõmerpalu (Estonian: Sõmerpalu järv, also known as Sõmerpalu veskijärv and Sõmerpalu veehoidla) is a lake in Estonia. It is located in the village of Sõmerpalu in Võru Parish, Võru County.

== Physical description ==
The lake has an area of 10.3 hectares (25 acres). The lake has a maximum depth of 2.0 meters (6 ft 7 in). It is 830 meters (2,720 ft) long, and its shoreline measures 3,340 meters (10,960 ft).

== See also ==
- List of lakes of Estonia
