= Suurjärv =

Lake in Estonia

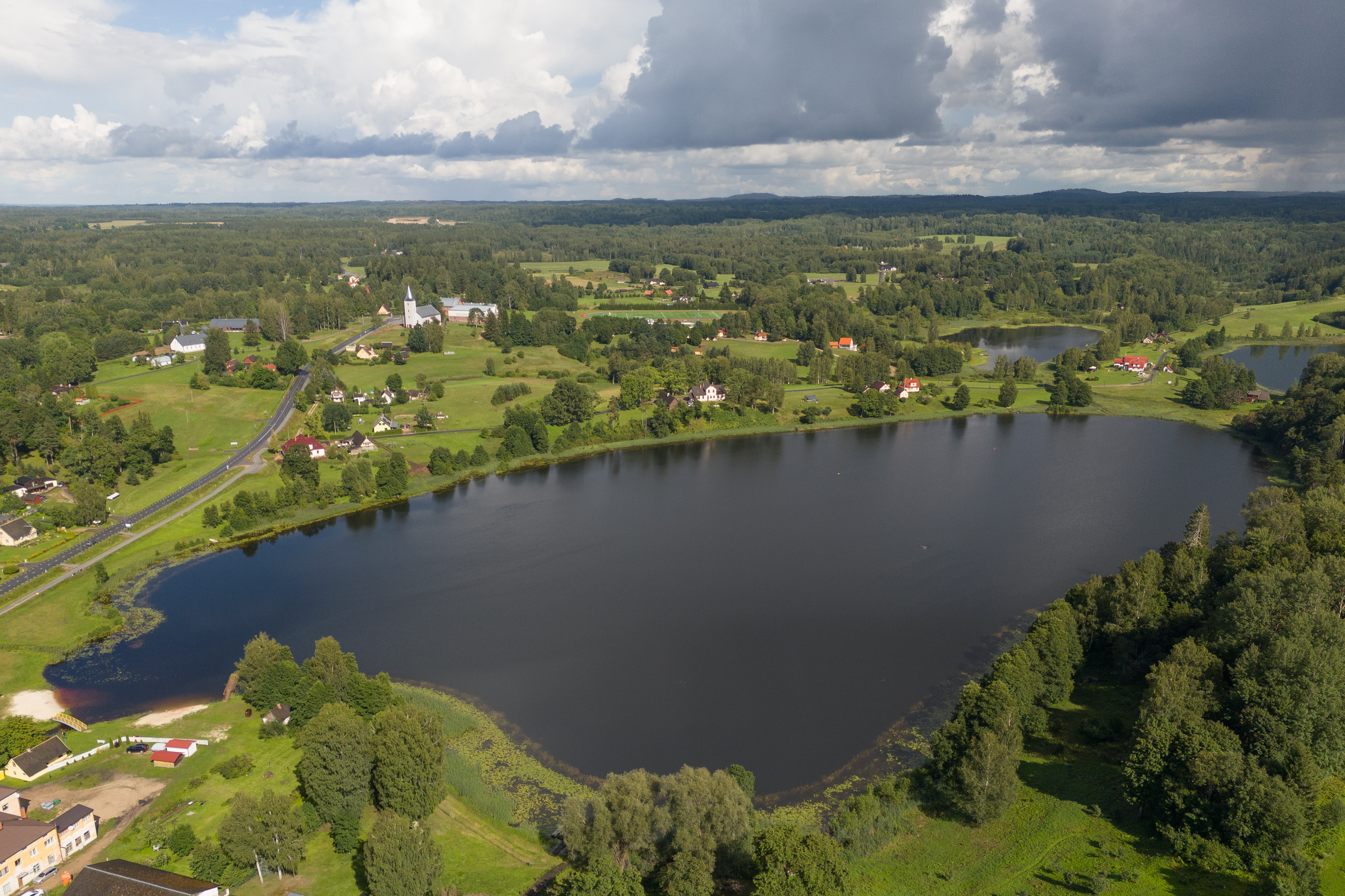
- Aerial view of Suurjärv

- Location within Estonia
- Location: Rõuge Parish, Võru County
- Coordinates: 57°43′40″N 26°55′20″E
- Basin countries: Estonia
- Max. length: 610 meters (2,000 ft)
- Surface area: 14.7 hectares (36 acres)
- Average depth: 13.2 meters (43 ft)
- Max. depth: 38.0 meters (124.7 ft)
- Water volume: 1,994,000 cubic meters (70,400,000 cu ft)
- Shore length^{1}: 1,610 meters (5,280 ft)
- Surface elevation: 116.2 meters (381 ft)
- ^{1} Shore length is not a well-defined measure.

Suurjärv (also known as Rõuge Suurjärv) is a lake Estonia. It is located in the settlement of Rõuge in Rõuge Parish, Võru County. It is the deepest lake in Estonia.

== Physical description ==
The lake has an area of 14.7 hectares (36 acres). The lake has an average depth of 13.2 meters (43 ft) and a maximum depth of 38.0 meters (124.7 ft). It is 610 meters (2,000 ft) long, and its shoreline measures 1,610 meters (5,280 ft). It has a volume of 1,994,000 cubic meters (70,400,000 cu ft).

== See also ==
- List of lakes of Estonia
