= Lake Vaikne =

Lake in Estonia

- Vaikne järv (Estonian)
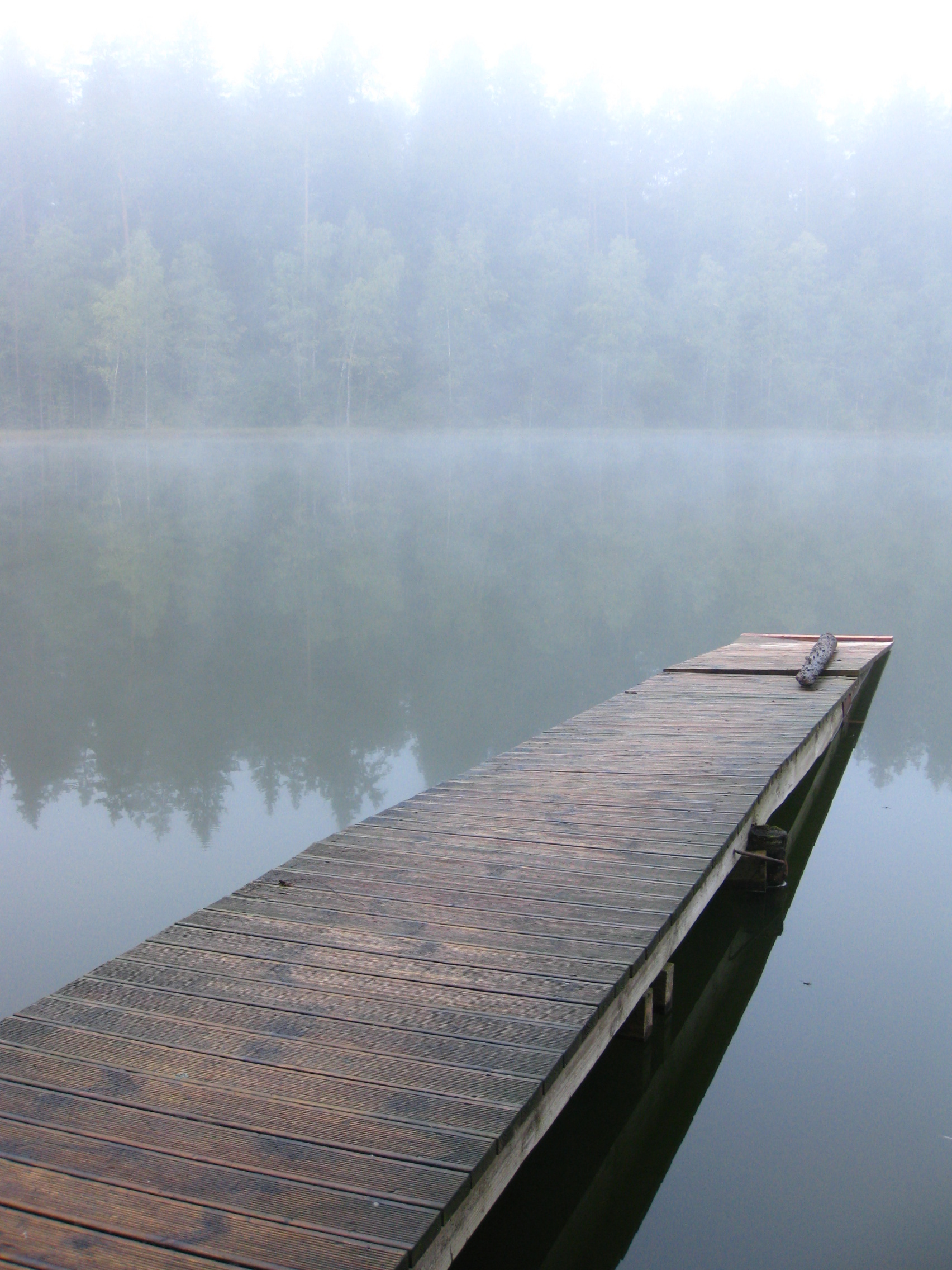

- Location within Estonia
- Coordinates: 58°12′33″N 26°25′39″E
- Basin countries: Estonia
- Max. length: 130 meters (430 ft)
- Surface area: 1.2 hectares (3.0 acres)
- Shore length^{1}: 410 meters (1,350 ft)
- Surface elevation: 43.4 meters (142 ft)
- ^{1} Shore length is not a well-defined measure.

Lake Vaikne (Estonian: Vaikne järv, also known as Illi järv) is a lake in Estonia. It is located in the village of Uderna in Elva Parish, Tartu County.

== Physical description ==
The lake has an area of 1.2 hectares (3.0 acres). It is 130 meters (430 ft) long, and its shoreline measures 410 meters (1,350 ft).

== See also ==
- List of lakes of Estonia
