= Ahvenajärv =

Lake in Estonia

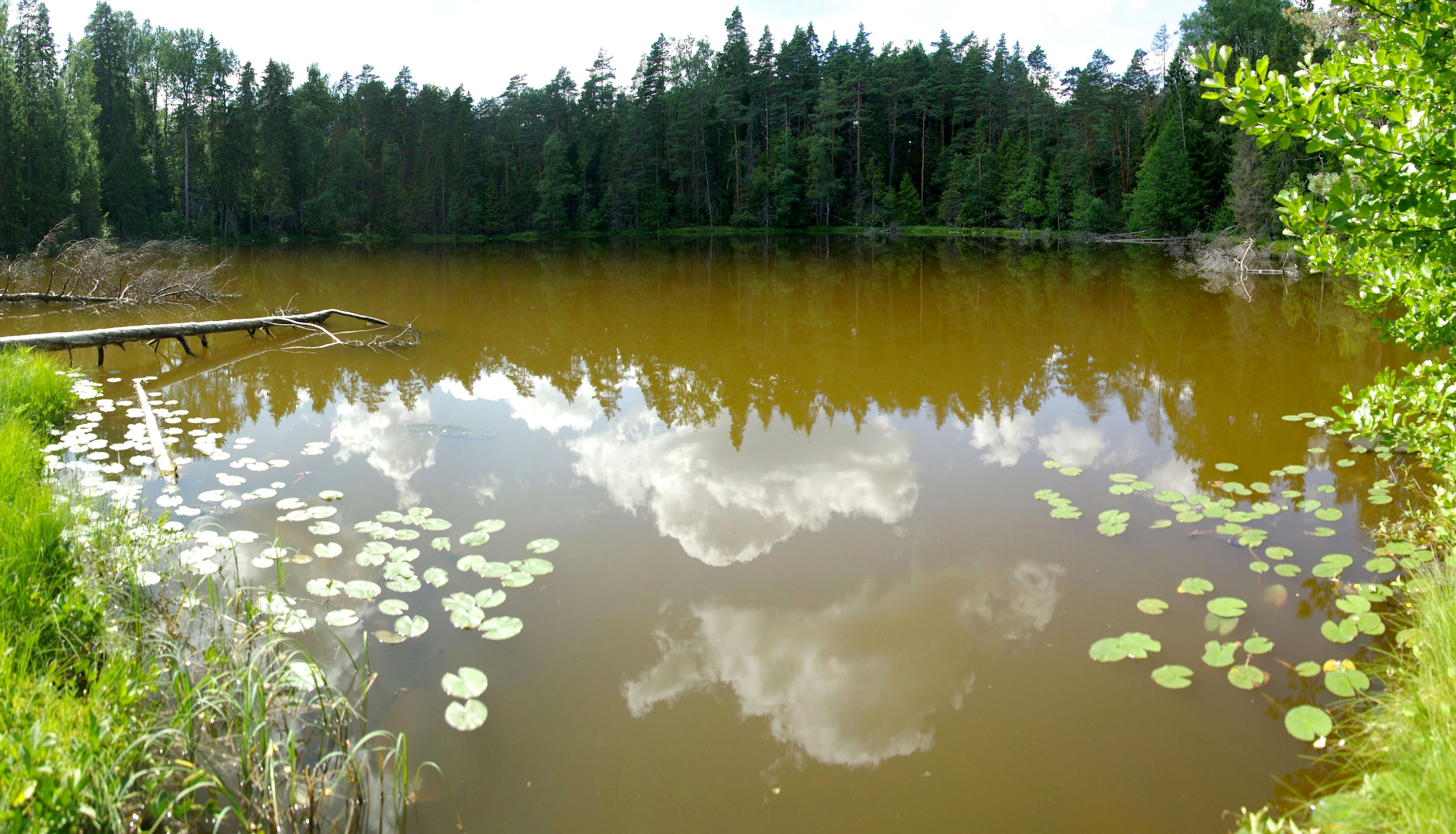

- Location within Estonia
- Coordinates: 58.0871°N 26.4615°E
- Basin countries: Estonia
- Max. length: 110 meters (360 ft)
- Surface area: 0.9 hectares (2.2 acres)
- Average depth: 5.0 meters (16.4 ft)
- Max. depth: 11.0 meters (36.1 ft)
- Water volume: 46,000 cubic meters (1,600,000 cu ft)
- Shore length^{1}: 340 meters (1,120 ft)
- Surface elevation: 69.7 meters (229 ft)
- ^{1} Shore length is not a well-defined measure.

Ahvenajärv (also Nelijärve Ahvenajärv, Aegviidu Ahvenjärv, or Linaleo järv) is a lake in Estonia. It is located in Mustjõe in Anija Parish, Harju County. It is one of the seven Nelijärve Lakes.

== Physical description ==
The lake has an area of 0.9 hectares (2.2 acres). The lake has an average depth of 5.0 meters (16.4 ft) and a maximum depth of 11.0 meters (36.1 ft). It is 110 meters (360 ft) long, and its shoreline measures 340 meters (1,120 ft). It has a volume of 46,000 cubic meters (1,600,000 cu ft).

== See also ==
- List of lakes of Estonia
