= Lake Küti =

Lake in Estonia

- Küti järv (Estonian)
- Location within Estonia
- Location: Sipe
- Coordinates: 58°14′38″N 26°49′13″E
- Type: Natural lake
- Primary inflows: Allika vesi
- Primary outflows: Kraav
- Basin countries: Estonia
- Max. length: 370 meters (1,210 ft)
- Surface area: 3.5 hectares (8.6 acres)
- Shore length^{1}: 870 meters (2,850 ft)
- Surface elevation: 74.5 meters (244 ft)
- ^{1} Shore length is not a well-defined measure.

Lake Küti (Estonian: Küti järv or Sipe järv) is a lake in Estonia. It is located in the village of Sipe in Kambja Parish, Tartu County.

== Physical description ==
The lake has an area of 3.5 hectares (8.6 acres). It is 370 meters (1,210 ft) long, and its shoreline measures 870 meters (2,850 ft).

== See also ==
- List of lakes of Estonia
