= Lake Lõõdla =

Lake in Estonia

- Lõõdla järv (Estonian)
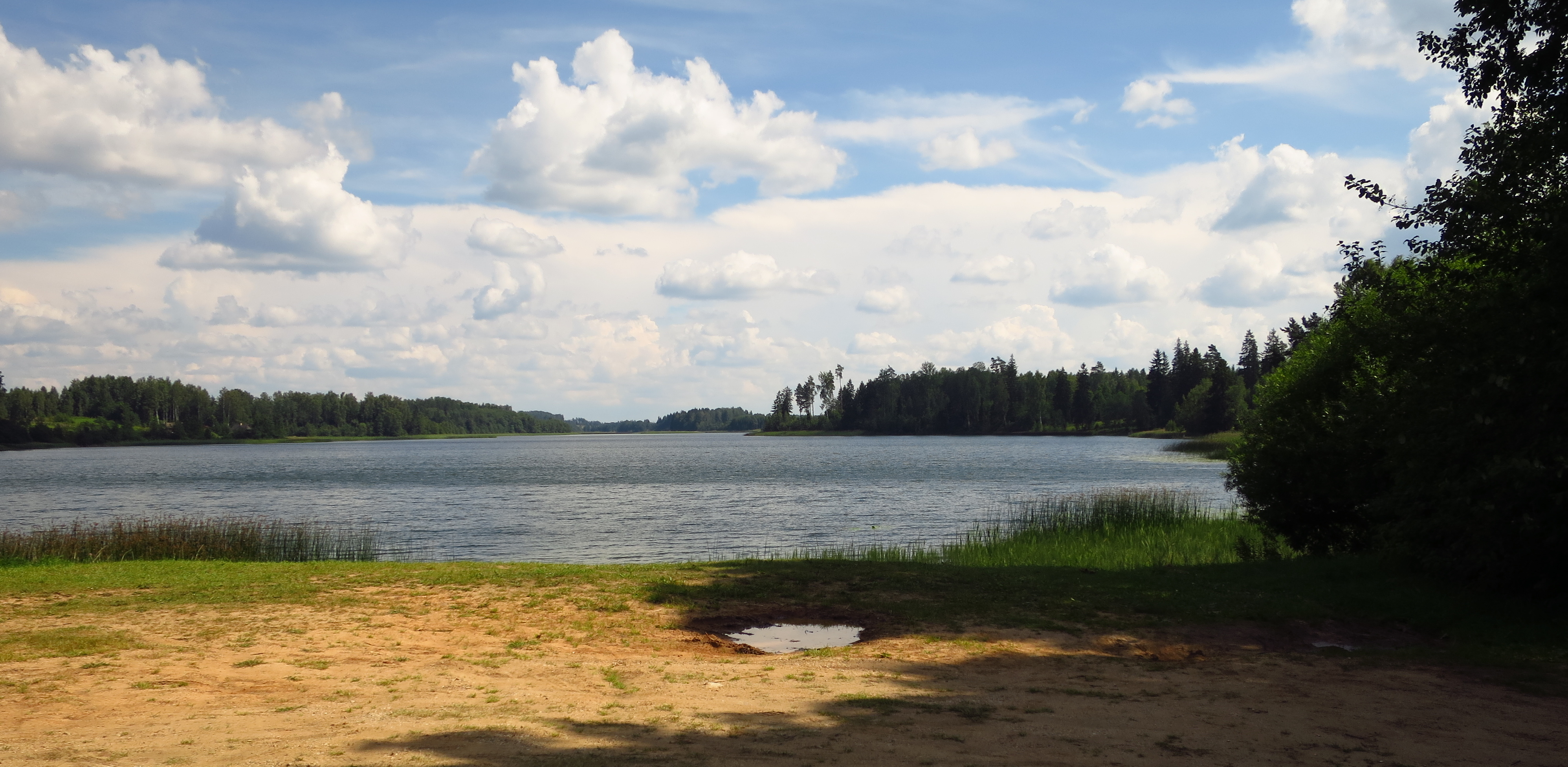

- Location within Estonia
- Coordinates: 57.8684314°N 26.6522796°E
- Basin countries: Estonia
- Max. length: 3,540 meters (11,610 ft)
- Surface area: 99.8 hectares (247 acres)
- Average depth: 4.5 meters (15 ft)
- Max. depth: 8.9 meters (29 ft)
- Water volume: 4,478,000 cubic meters (158,100,000 cu ft)
- Shore length^{1}: 9,250 meters (30,350 ft)
- Surface elevation: 104.1 meters (342 ft)
- Islands: 2
- ^{1} Shore length is not a well-defined measure.

Lake Lõõdla (Estonian: Lõõdla järv, also Leedla järv) is a lake in Estonia. It is located in the village of Liiva in Võru Parish, Võru County.

== Physical description ==
The lake has an area of 99.8 hectares (247 acres), and it has two islands with a combined area of 0.5 hectares (1.2 acres). The lake has an average depth of 4.5 meters (15 ft) and a maximum depth of 8.9 meters (29 ft). It is 3,540 meters (11,610 ft) long, and its shoreline measures 9,250 meters (30,350 ft). It has a volume of 4,478,000 cubic meters (158,100,000 cu ft).

== See also ==
- List of lakes of Estonia
