= Lake Pille =

Lake in Estonia

- Pille järv (Estonian)
- Location within Estonia
- Coordinates: 57°55′45.82″N 27°6′15.95″E
- Basin countries: Estonia
- Max. length: 460 meters (1,510 ft)
- Surface area: 7.4 hectares (18 acres)
- Average depth: 3.6 meters (12 ft)
- Max. depth: 9.7 meters (32 ft)
- Shore length^{1}: 1,150 meters (3,770 ft)
- Surface elevation: 78.7 meters (258 ft)
- ^{1} Shore length is not a well-defined measure.

Lake Pille (Estonian: Pille järv) is a lake in Estonia. It is located in the village of Pille in Võru Parish, Võru County.

== Physical description ==
The lake has an area of 7.4 hectares (18 acres). The lake has an average depth of 3.6 meters (12 ft) and a maximum depth of 9.7 meters (32 ft). It is 460 meters (1,510 ft) long, and its shoreline measures 1,150 meters (3,770 ft).

== See also ==
- List of lakes of Estonia
