= Lake Tsopa =

Lake in Estonia

- Tsopa järv (Estonian)
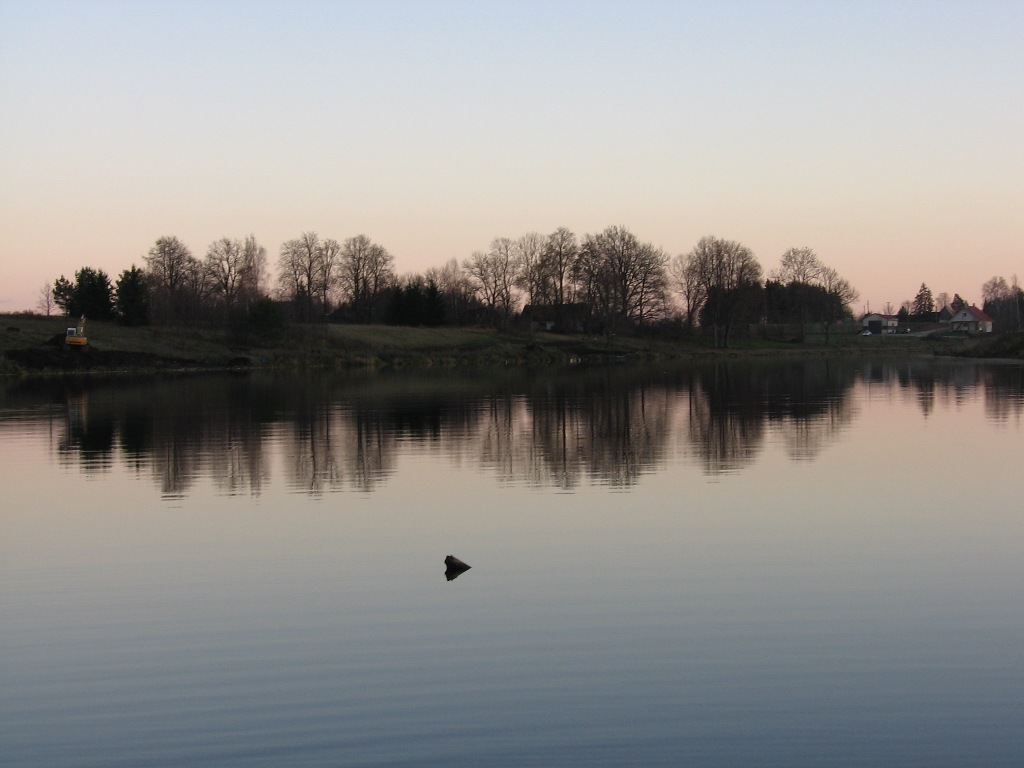
- The lake in autumn 2008

- Location within Estonia
- Location: Voru County
- Coordinates: 57.879215°N 26.9596125°E
- Basin countries: Estonia
- Max. length: 820 meters (2,690 ft)
- Surface area: 9.2 hectares (23 acres)
- Shore length^{1}: 2,020 meters (6,630 ft)
- Surface elevation: 71.1 meters (233 ft)
- Islands: 1
- ^{1} Shore length is not a well-defined measure.

Lake Tsopa (Estonian: Tsopa järv, also known as Põrmu järv, Põrmujärv, or Kogrejärv) is a lake in Estonia. It is located in the village of Navi in Võru Parish, Võru County.

== Physical description ==
The lake has an area of 9.2 hectares (23 acres), and it one island with an area of 0.03 hectares (0.074 acres). It is 820 meters (2,690 ft) long, and its shoreline measures 2,020 meters (6,630 ft).

== See also ==
- List of lakes of Estonia
