= Lake Järvepää =

Lake in Estonia

- Järvepää järv (Estonian)
- Location within Estonia
- Coordinates: 57°57′20″N 27°28′27″E
- Basin countries: Estonia
- Max. length: 760 meters (2,490 ft)
- Surface area: 11.9 hectares (29 acres)
- Average depth: 3.0 meters (9.8 ft)
- Max. depth: 4.5 meters (15 ft)
- Water volume: 400,000 cubic meters (14,000,000 cu ft)
- Shore length^{1}: 1,920 meters (6,300 ft)
- Surface elevation: 33.4 meters (110 ft)
- ^{1} Shore length is not a well-defined measure.

Lake Järvepää (Estonian: Järvepää järv, also Järvepera järv or Kahkva järv) is a lake of Estonia. It is located in the village of Järvepää in Setomaa Parish, Võru County.

== Physical description ==
The lake has an area of 11.9 hectares (29 acres). The lake has an average depth of 3.0 meters (9.8 ft) and a maximum depth of 4.5 meters (15 ft). It is 760 meters (2,490 ft) long, and its shoreline measures 1,920 meters (6,300 ft). It has a volume of 400,000 cubic meters (14,000,000 cu ft).

== See also ==
- List of lakes in Estonia
