= Lake Kahrila =

Lake in Estonia

- Kahrila järv (Estonian)
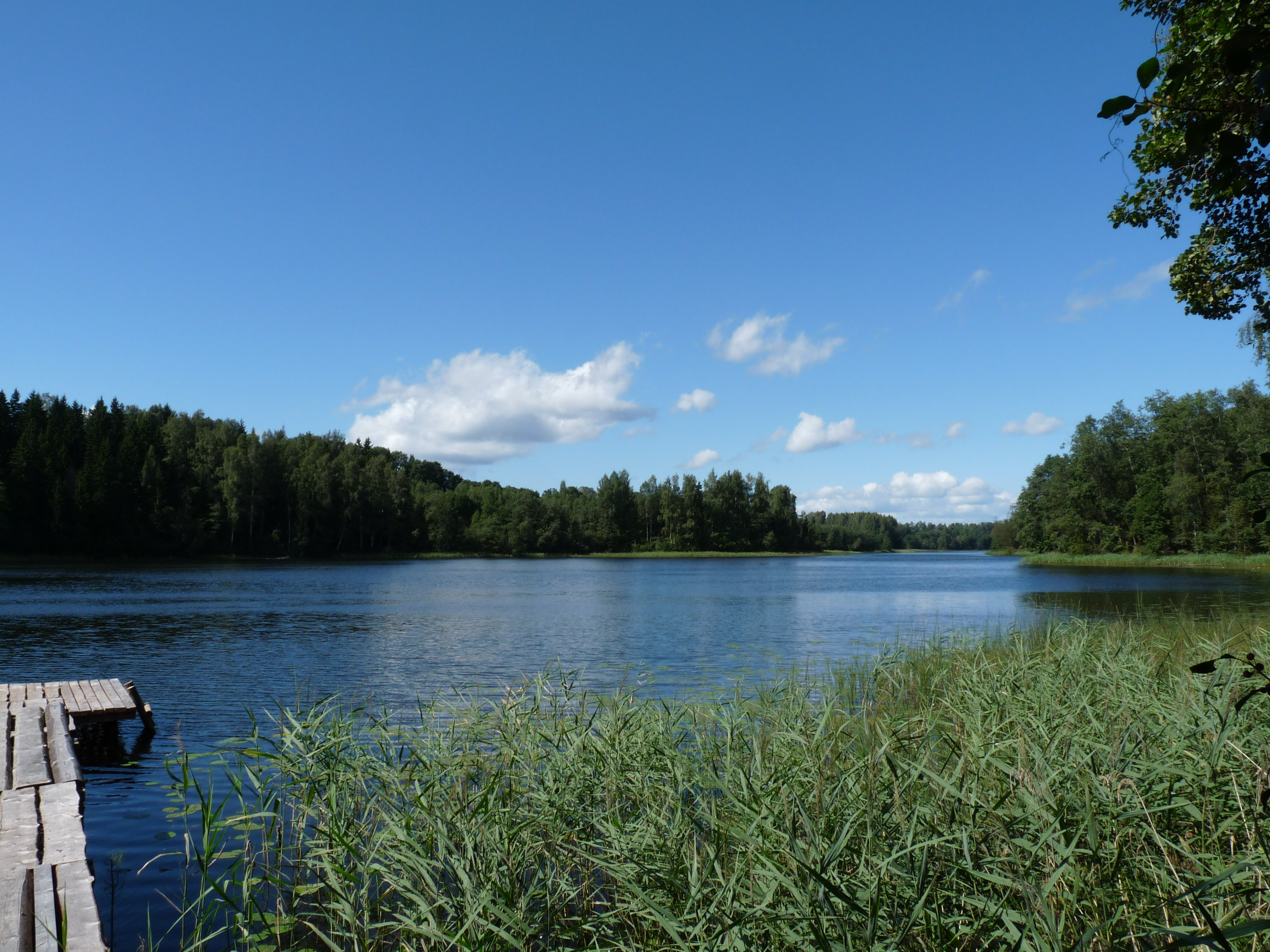

- Location within Estonia
- Coordinates: 57°45′29″N 26°52′42″E
- Basin countries: Estonia
- Max. length: 2,490 meters (8,170 ft)
- Surface area: 40.3 hectares (100 acres)
- Average depth: 4.7 meters (15 ft)
- Max. depth: 16.4 meters (54 ft)
- Water volume: 1,907,000 cubic meters (67,300,000 cu ft)
- Shore length^{1}: 5,580 meters (18,310 ft)
- Surface elevation: 98.6 meters (323 ft)
- ^{1} Shore length is not a well-defined measure.

Lake Kahrila (Estonian: Kahrila järv) is a hard water eutrophic lake in Estonia. It is located in the village of Lauri in Rõuge Parish, Võru County.

== Physical description ==
The lake has an area of 40.3 hectares (100 acres). The lake has an average depth of 4.7 meters (15 ft) and a maximum depth of 16.4 meters (54 ft). It is 2,490 meters (8,170 ft) long, and its shoreline measures 5,580 meters (18,310 ft). It has a volume of 1,907,000 cubic meters (67,300,000 cu ft).

== Gallery ==
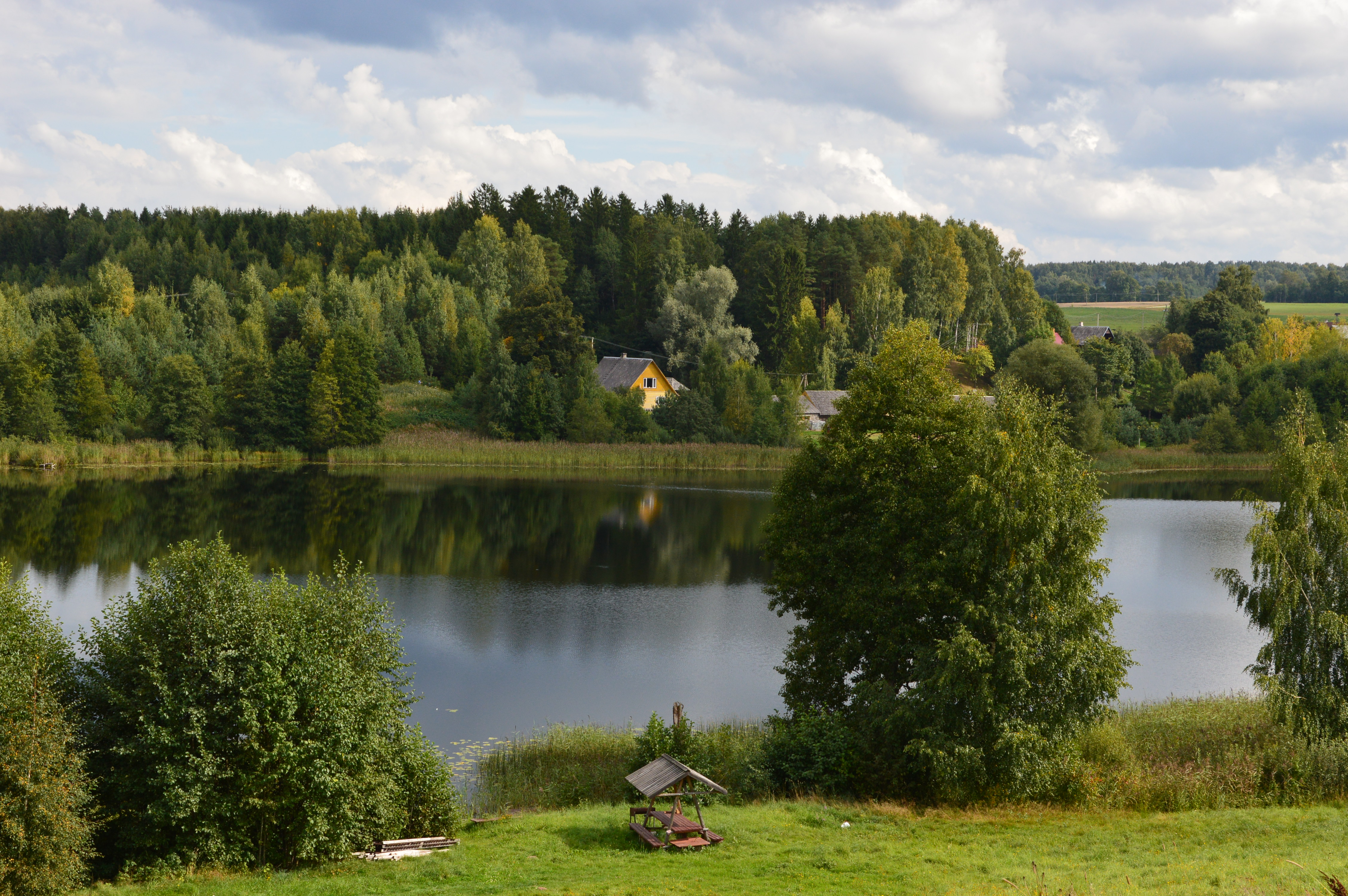

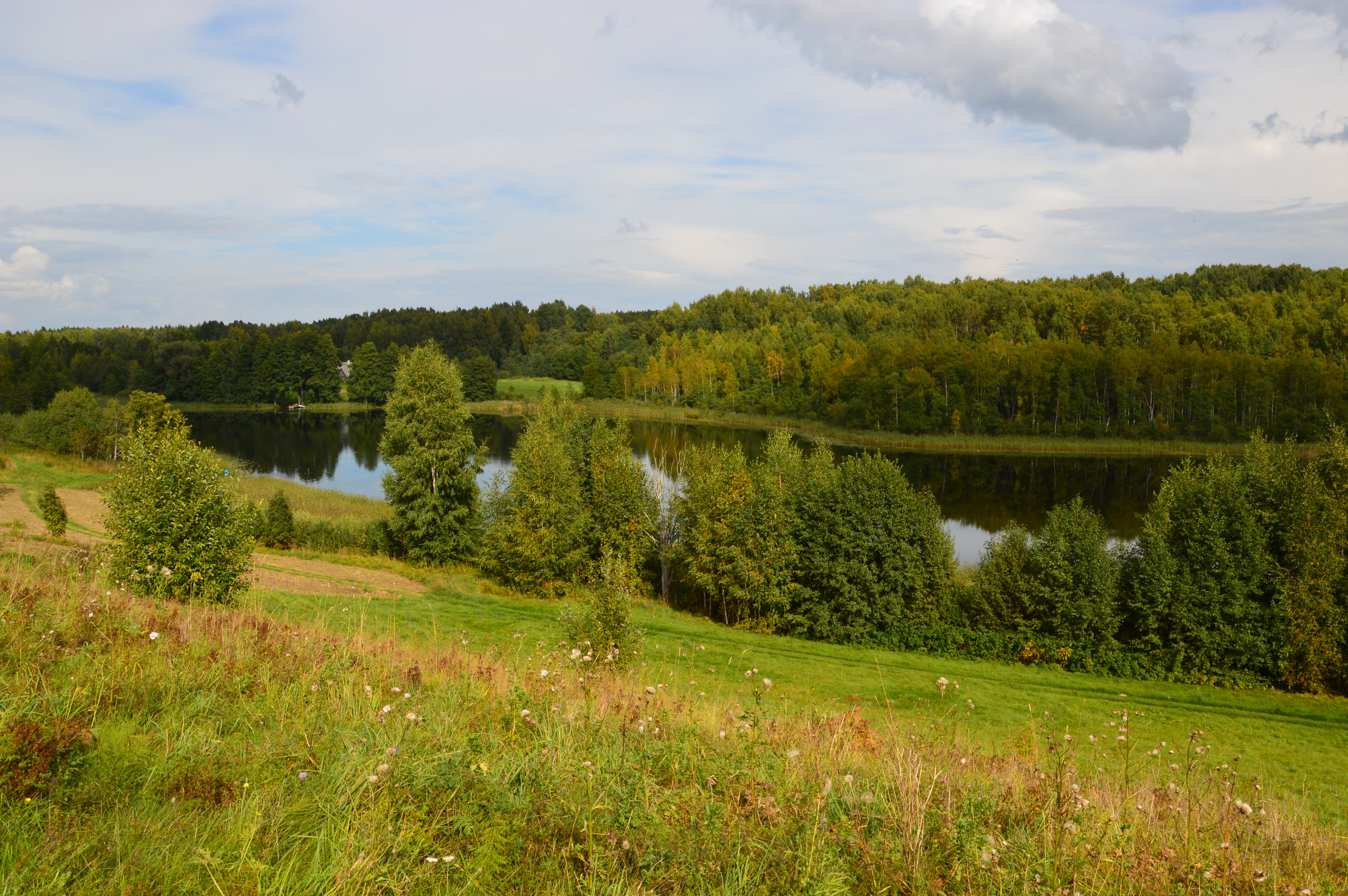

== See also ==
- List of lakes of Estonia
