= Päidla Lake District =

Group of lakes in Estonia

Päidla Lake District is located in Valga County, Estonia. It consists of 11 lakes. Total area of lakes is 1,4 km2.

These lakes are eutrophic.

== Lakes ==
1. Kalmejärv
2. Mõrtsuka Lake
3. Näkijärv
4. Nõuni Lake
5. Päidla Ahvenjärv
6. Päidla Kõverjärv
7. Päidla Mõisajärv
8. Päidla Mudajärv
9. Päidla Uibujärv
10. Päidla Väikejärv
11. Räbi Lake
12. Väike-Nõuni Lake
