= Viitka =

Village in Estonia

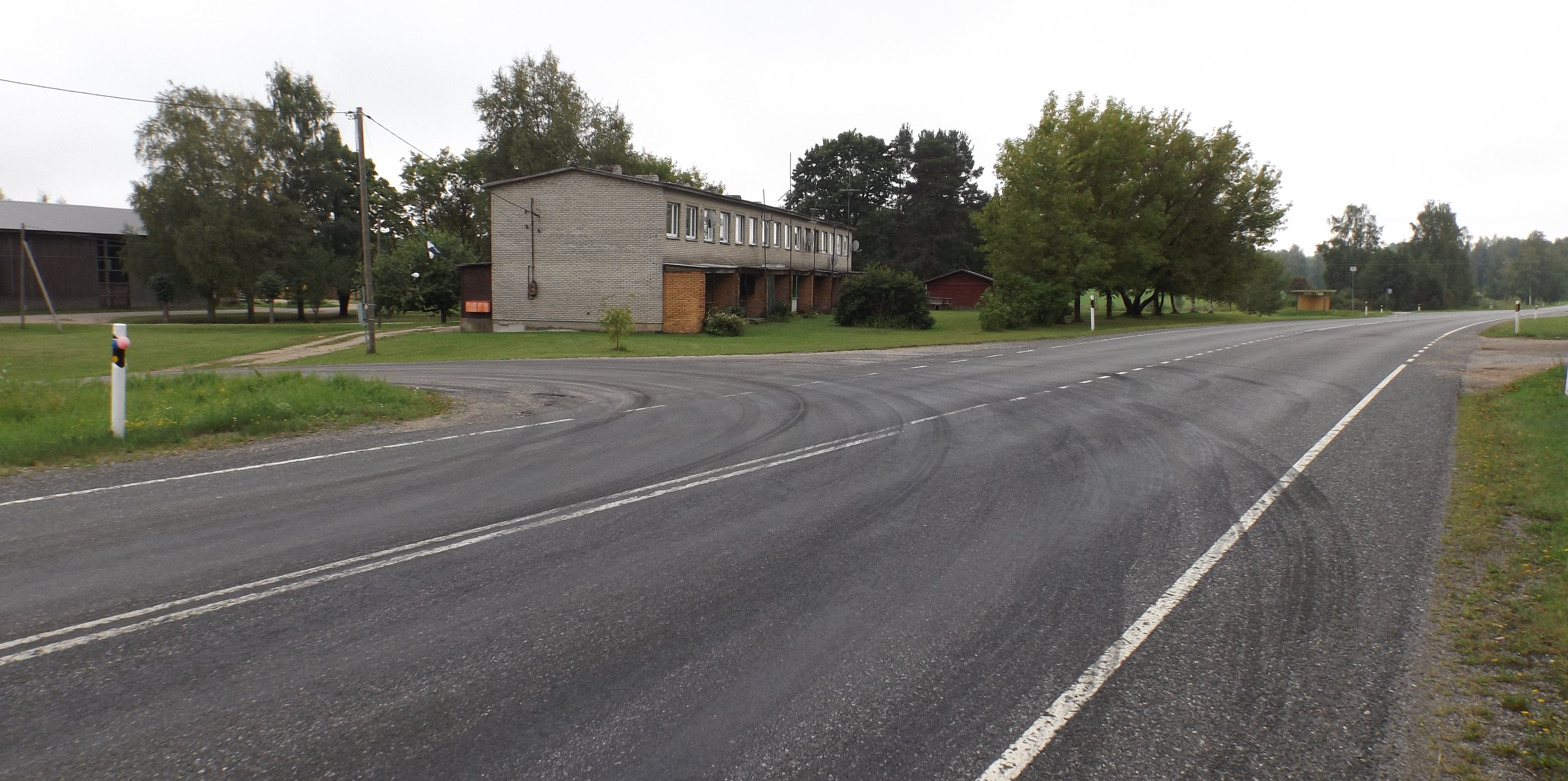
- The road from Võru to Luhamaa in Viitka

- Location within Estonia
- Coordinates: 57°41′20″N 27°19′57″E
- Country: Estonia
- County: Võru County
- Time zone: UTC+2 (EET)

Viitka is a settlement in Võru Parish, Võru County in southeastern Estonia.
