= Luigetiik =

Pond in Tallinn, Estonia

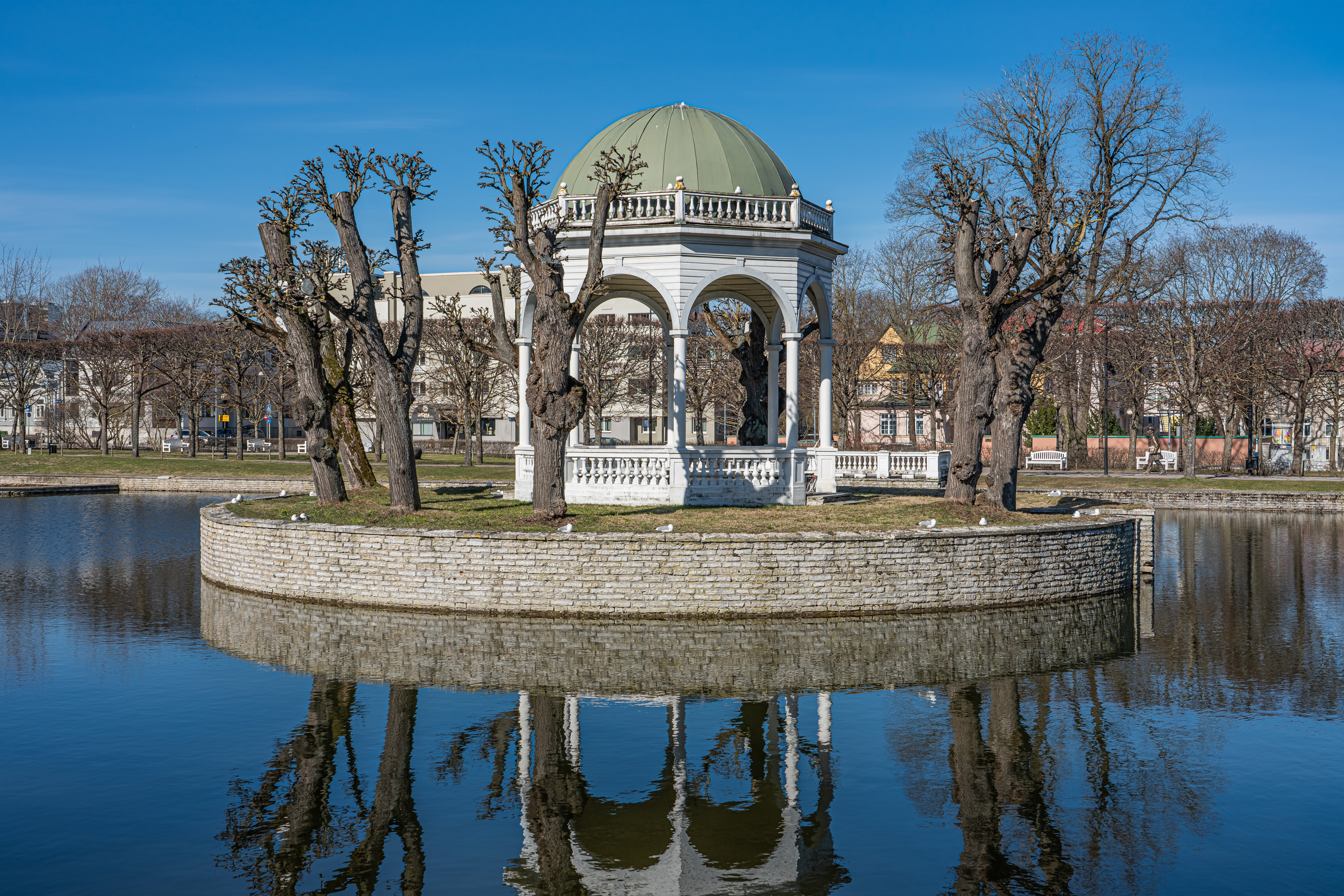
- Luigetiik with island

- Location within Estonia
- Coordinates: 59°26′17″N 24°47′11″E

Luigetiik is a pond in Tallinn, the capital city of Estonia. It is situated inside Kadriorg Park, close to Kadriorg Palace.

== Gallery ==
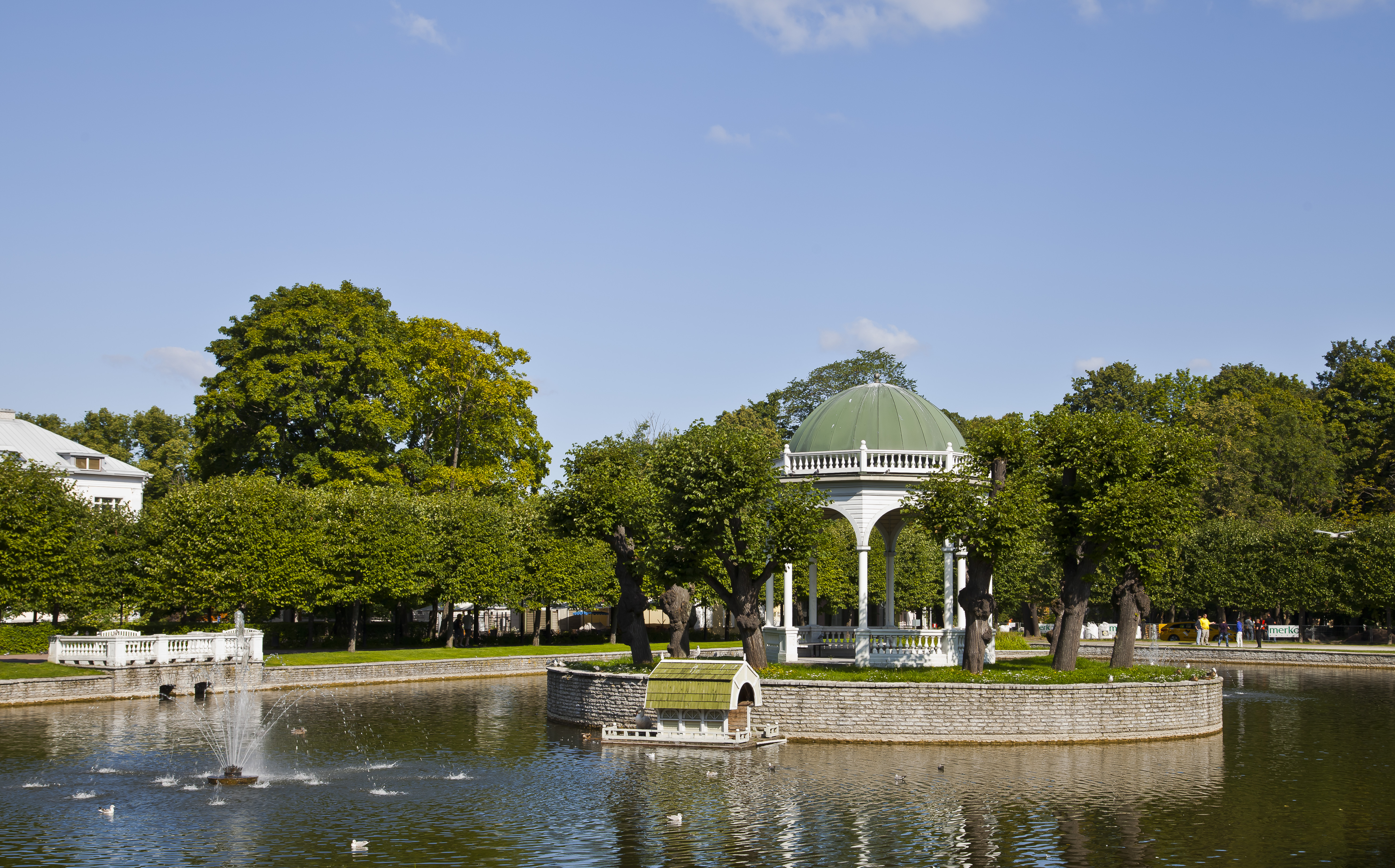

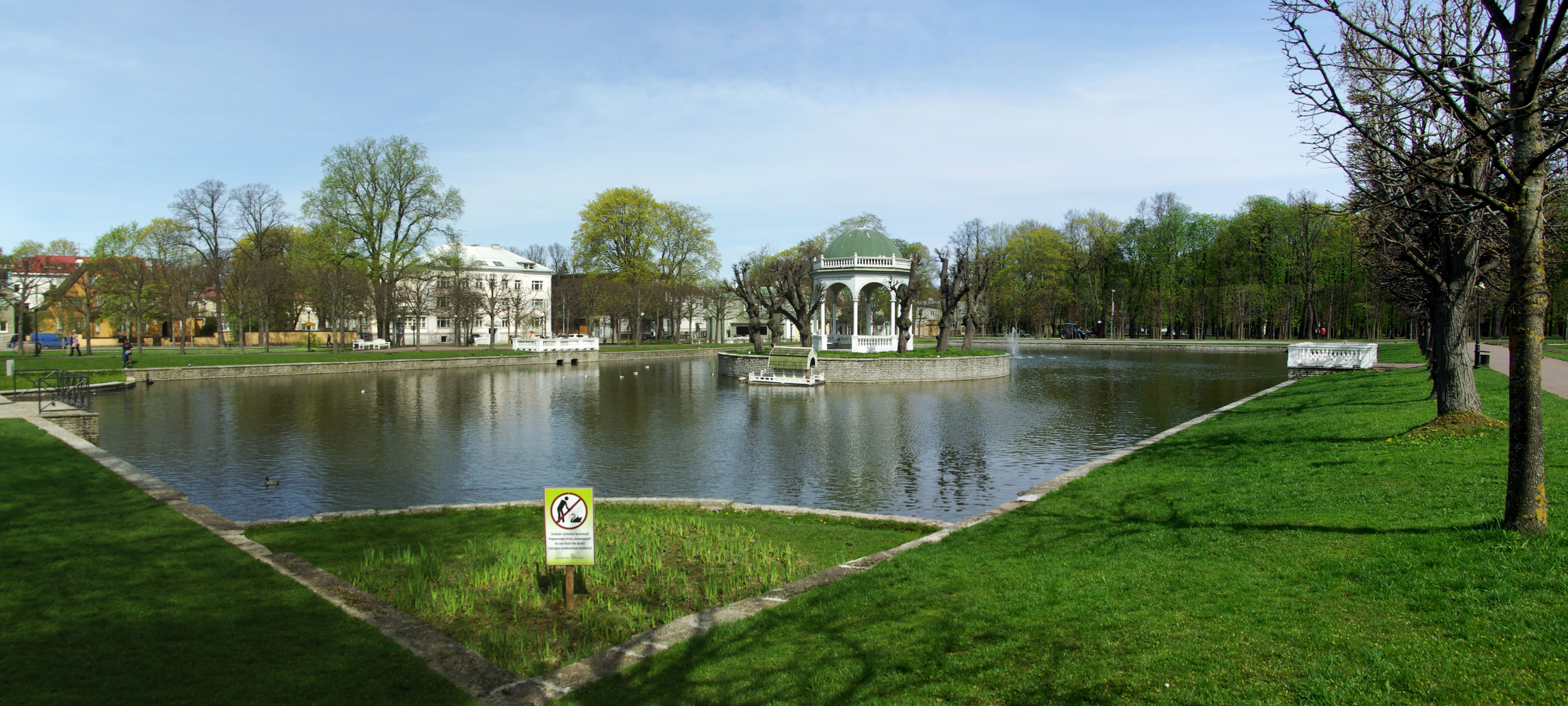

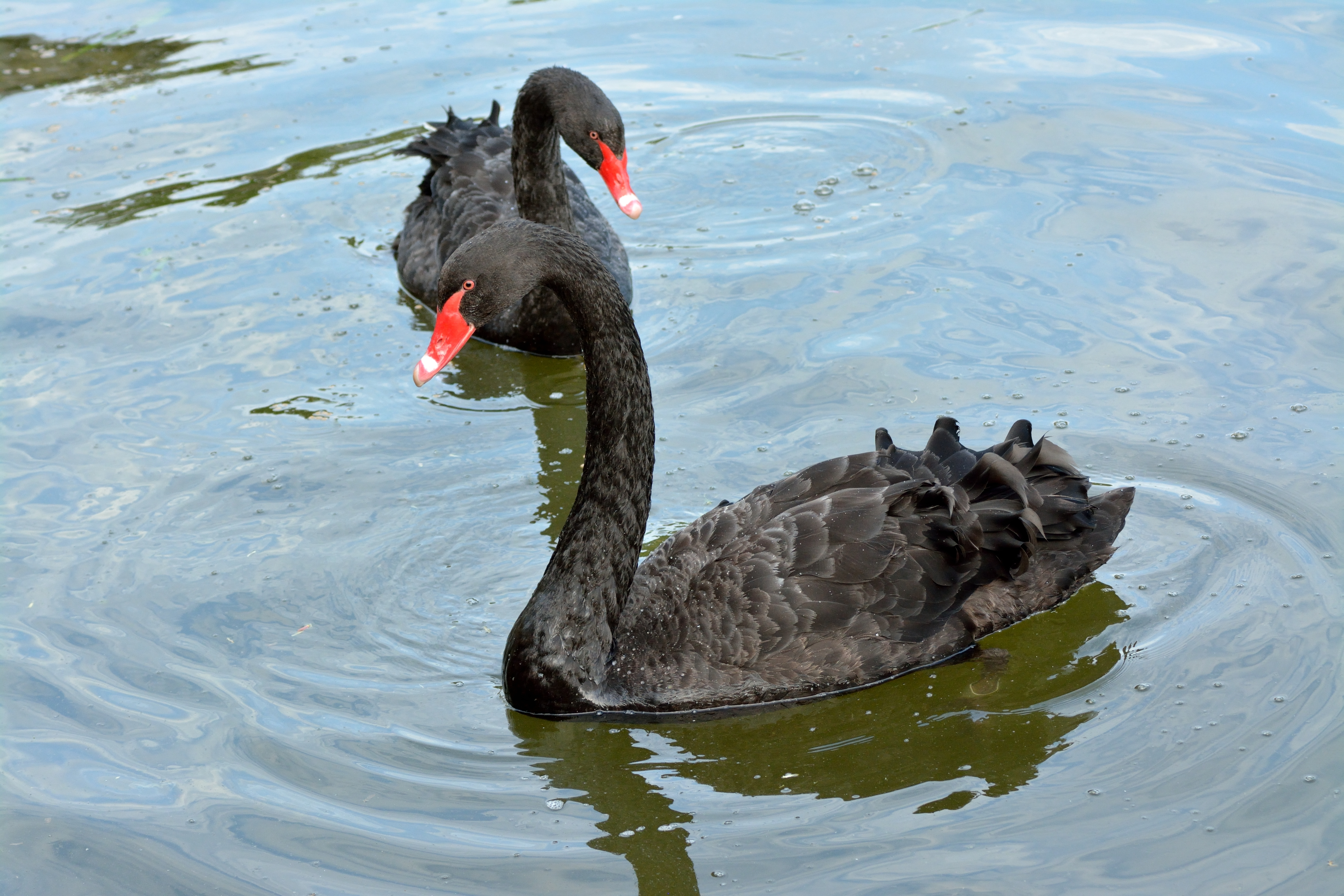
Black swans

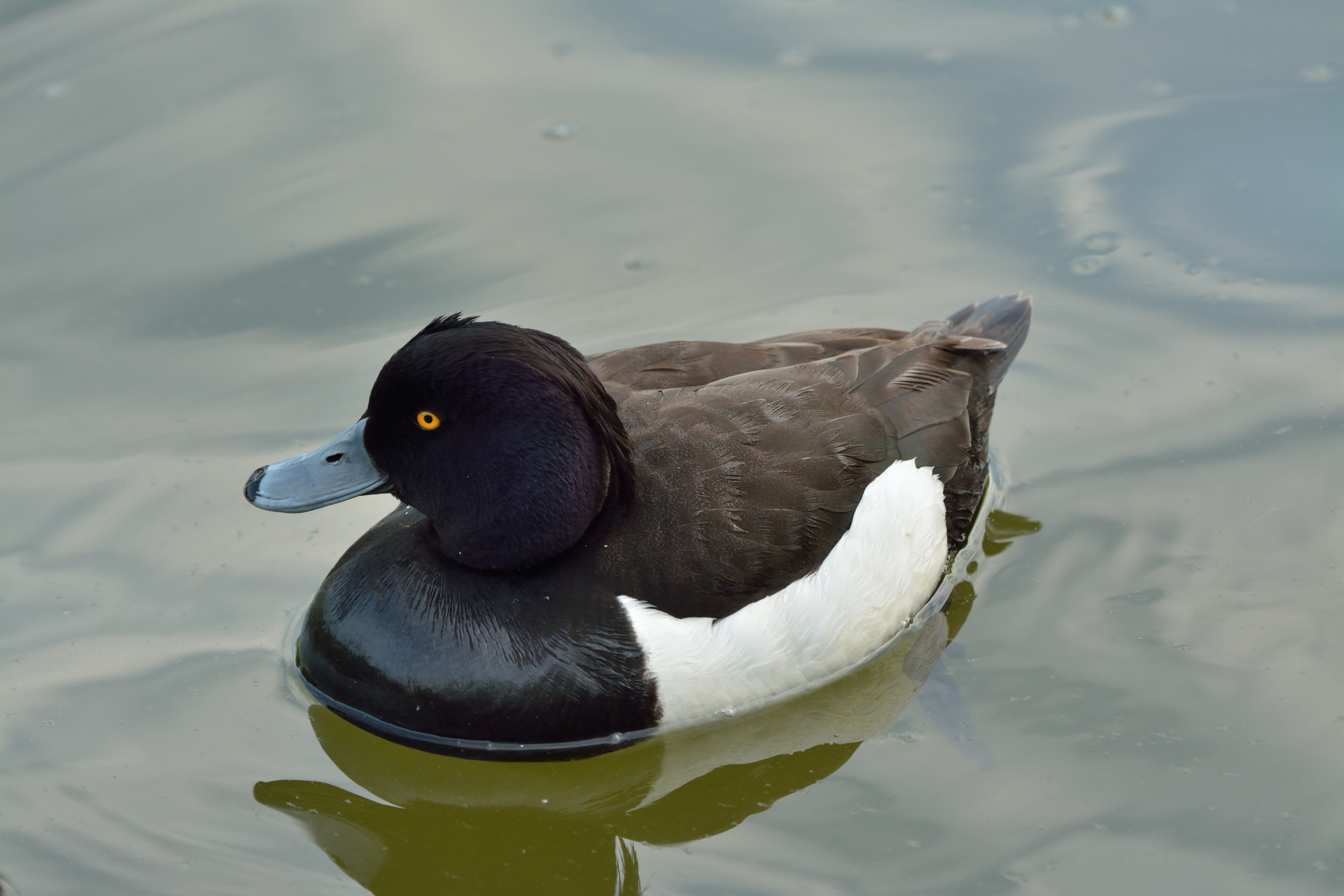
Male tufted duck
