= List of lakes of Estonia =

This is a list of lakes (including reservoirs) in Estonia.

== Largest lakes ==
Largest lakes of Estonia
#	Name	Area		Greatest depth		Average depth		Length of shoreline		Notes
#	Name	ha	acre	m	ft	m	ft	km	miles	Notes
1.	Peipus	351,144.9	867,698	17.6	57.7	8.0	26.2	788.410	489.895	Shared with Russia, 1,570 km^{2} (610 sq mi) in Estonia
2.	Võrtsjärv	26,901.5	66,475	6.0	19.7	2.8	9.2	130.874	81.321	
3.	Narva Reservoir	10,226.8	25,271	9.0	29.5	1.9	6.2	209.484	130.167	Shared with Russia, 40 km^{2} (15 sq mi) in Estonia
4.	Ülemiste	940.9	2,325	4.2	13.8	2.5	8.2	15.219	9.457	Source of drinking water for Tallinn
5.	Saadjärv	724.5	1,790	25.0	82.0	8.0	26.2	19.362	12.031	
6.	Vagula	602.8	1,490	11.5	37.7	5.3	17.4	17.838	11.084	
7.	Suurlaht	531.0	1,312	2.1	6.9	1.2	3.9	16.173	10.049	Part of Mullutu-Suurlaht
8.	Veisjärv	481.1	1,189	4.0	13.1	1.3	4.3	9.047	5.622	
9.	Ermistu	456.2	1,127	2.9	9.5	1.3	4.3	19.545	12.145	
10.	Paunküla Reservoir	415.8	1,027	8.7	28.5	3.4	11.2	25.541	15.870	Source of drinking water for Tallinn
11.	Mullutu Bay	412.7	1,020	1.7	5.6	0.9	3.0	19.530	12.135	Part of Mullutu-Suurlaht
12.	Kuremaa	399.6	987	13.8	45.3	5.9	19.4	11.261	6.997	
13.	Karujärv	345.6	854	5.5	18.0	1.6	5.2	12.276	7.628	
14.	Kahala	345.6	854	2.8	9.2	0.9	3.0	8.727	5.423	
15.	Tõhela	338.5	836	1.5	4.9	1.3	4.3	12.021	7.470	
16.	Pühajärv	290.7	718	8.5	27.9	4.3	14.1	16.332	10.148	
17.	2nd sedimentary pool of Estonian Thermal Power Plant	290.6	718					9.354	5.812	
18.	Endla	285.9	706	2.4	7.9	1.5	4.9	28.057	17.434	
19.	Koosa	282.7	699	1.9	6.2	1.2	3.9	7.741	4.810	
20.	Soodla Reservoir	262.8	649	13.0	42.7	3.2	10.5	26.542	16.492	Source of drinking water for Tallinn
21.	Kaiavere	248.0	613	5.0	16.4	2.8	9.2	8.442	5.246	
22.	Lake Aheru	232.5	575	4.5	14.8	3.7	12.1	10.127	6.293	
23.	Tamula	208.9	516	7.5	24.6	4.2	13.8	6.465	4.017	
24.	Hino	207.1	512	10.4	34.1	3.1	10.2	11.516	7.156	
25.	Sutlepa Sea	203.3	502	1.5	4.9	1.2	3.9	11.802	7.333	
26.	Kalli	198.7	491	1.4	4.6	1.1	3.6	11.634	7.229	
27.	Raku	196.9	487	12.0	39.4	7.0	23.0	15.083	9.372	
28.	Lavassaare	196.0	484	1.0	3.3	0.7	2.3	7.146	4.440	
29.	Õisu	193.7	479	4.3	14.1	2.8	9.2	6.985	4.340	

== All lakes ==
This list is incomplete

Name	Area (ha)	Greatest depth (m)	Average depth (m)	Length of shoreline	Location (County, Municipality)	Notes	Image	Coordinates
Lake Aabra								
Lake Aardla								
Aastejärv	10.6	1			Saaremaa, Saare			58°30′22″N 21°55′48″E
Lake Aeli	9.9							
Lake Agali								
Lake Agusalu	2.7							
Aheru								
Ähijärv (Ähijärve)								
Ahijärv (Ahunapalu)								
Ahijärv (Koloreino)	1.3							
Ahtriskeloik	4.1			1182 km	Saare County, Saaremaa Parish			
Ahvenajärv	0.9	11			Harju, Anija			
Päidla Ahvenjärv	5.6	5.1		1030	Valga, Otepää	Päidla Lake District		
Ainja Sinejärv								
Aknajärv								
Akste								
Alajärv (Väimela)								
Alajärv (Viitina)								
Lake Alatskivi								
Alatskivi								
Prandi Allikajärv	1.0							
Alopi								
Andsu Lakes								
Ansiauk								
Äntu Lakes								
Lake Arbi								
Arojärv								
Auksi								
Lake Eistvere								
Lake Engli								
Lake Elistvere								
Lake Erastvere								
Erastvere								
Lake Ermistu	456.2	2.9	1.3	19,545				
Harju Bay					Saare County	Earlier was a bay		
Lake Harku								
Lake Hilba								
Lake Hino								
Hüüdru								
Illi Lakes								
Lake Imatu								
Imatu								
Lake Jaala								
Jaala								
Lake Jalase	2.5							
Janokjärv								
Lake Järvepää								
Järvepää								
Jõksi								
Kahrila								
Lake Kadastiku	7.2							
Lake Kahala	345.6	2.8	0.9	8,727				
Kajumeri								
Kakerdi								
Kalijärv								
Lake Kalli								
Kalmejärv	3.0	3.0		450	Valga, Otepää	Päidla Lake District		
Kanariku					Võru County, Võru Parish			
Kappelkärre								
Karijärv								
Karjatse Sea								
Kärnjärv								
Lake Karsna								
Karujärv	345.6	5.5	1.6					
Lake Karula	22.1							
Kasaritsa verijärv								
Lake Käsmu								
Kastjärv								
Kaunissaare Reservoir								
Lake Kauru								
Lake Kavadi								
Keema Lakes								
Lake Keeri								
Kiidjärv								
Kikkajärv								
Lake Kirikumäe								
Kirikumäe								
Lake Kiruvere								
Kisejärv								
Kisejärve Lakes								
Kivijärv (Kivijärve)								
Kivijärv (Osula)								
Kivijärv (Palumäe)								
Kivijärv (Pillapalu)								
Kivijärv (Rahtla)								
Kivijärv (Uibujärve)								
Lake Klooga								
Klooga								
Kõnnu Pikkjärv								
Konsu järv								
Lake Koolma	6.4							
Lake Koosa								
Koosa								
Kõvvõrjärv								
Krokatstaindappen								
Kubija								
Küläjärv								
Lake Kuningvere	24.5							
Lake Kuremaa	399.6	13.8	5.9					
Kurgjärv								
Kurtna Valgejärv	8.6					part of Kurtna Lake District		
Päidla Kõverjärv	6.1	5.7		1300	Valga, Otepää	Päidla Lake District		
Lake Küti								
Lahojärv								
Lake Peipus								
Lämmijärv								
Lake Lasva								
Lasva								
Laukasoo Suurlaugas	4				Lääne-Viru			
Lake Lavassaare								
Lavassaare								
Leevaku Reservoir								
Leigo								
Lihlhamne	4.8				Lääne			
Liinjärv								
Lake Limu	19.8							
Linajärv (Viitna)	4.2							
Linnulaht					Saare	Earlier was a bay		
Lake Lohja								
Lõõdla								
Lake Loosu								
Luigetiik								
Lüübnitsa umbjärv								
Lake Maardu								
Mäejärv (Väimela)								
Lake Männiku								
Lake Martiska	3.0							
Lake Meelva								
Möldri Sea								
Päidla Mõisajärv	15.3	6.8	4.2	1700	Valga, Otepää	Päidla Lake District		
Mõrtsuka	23.8	5.4	3.7	2950	Valga, Otepää	Päidla Lake District		
Päidla Mudajärv	1.2			416	Valga, Otepää	Päidla Lake District		
Mullutu-Suurlaht	412.7	1.7	0.9					
Lake Murati								
Murati								
Must-Jaala	1.1				Ida-Viru			
Narva Reservoir	10,226.8	9.0	1.9	209,484				
Neitsijärv								
Lake Nigula								
Nikejärv	4.0							
Lake Niinsaare								
Little Lake Niinsaare	0.6				Ida-Viru			
Noodasjärv								
Nootjärv								
Lake Nõuni	81.7	14.7	6.1	5800	Valga, Otepää	Largest lake of the Päidla Lake District		
Väike-Nõuni	6.3	7		1025	Valga, Otepää	Päidla Lake District		
Näkijärv	11.7	4.3	3	1420	Valga, Otepää	Päidla Lake District		
Nüpli								
Lake Nurme	20.5							
Lake Oandu	3.5							
Oessaare Bay						formerly a bay		
Lake Pabra								
Paide Reservoir								
Lake Paidra								
Paidra								
Little Lake Palkna								
Lake Palujüri								
Lake Pangodi								
Pannjärv								
Pappjärv								
Paukjärv								
Paunküla Reservoir	415.8	8.7	3,4					
Big Pehmejärv								
Peipus (Peipsi)	351,144.9	17.6	8.0	788,410				
Pesujärv								
Petajärv	3.5							
Lake Piigandi								
Pillapalu Kivijärv	8.6							
Pskov (Pihkva)								
Piirakajärv								
Lake Pille								
Lake Poogandi								
Lake Porkuni								
Porkuni								
Puide Reservoir								
Punane	0.2				Ida-Viru			
Lake Prossa								
Pühajärv	290.7	8.5	4.3	16,332	Valga, Otepää			
Lake Pulli								
Purgatsi	4.7				Harju			
Lake Raadi								
Rääkjärv								
Lake Räätsma								
Räbi	9.5	5		1577	Valga, Otepää	Päidla Lake District		
Lake Raku								
Lake Raigastvere								
Raigastvere								
Räpina paisjärv								
Ratasjärv								
Lake Ratva								
Ratva								
Riisipere Valgejärv	10.9				Harju	part of Valgejärve Landscape Conservation Area		
Riiska	4.3				Valga			
Ropka	8.5							
Lake Roosna	2.9							
Saadjärv	724.5	25.0	8.0	19,362				
Lake Saare	27.0							
Selgjärv								
Šnelli tiik								
Soitsjärv								
Lake Soka (Lake Saka)	21.5							
Lake Sõmerpalu								
Supilinna pond								
Sutlepa meri								
Suurjärv								
Suur-Kikkajärv								
Suurlaht	531.0	2.1	1.2	16,173				
Suur Saarjärv	10.9							
Lake Tabina								
Tabina								
Lake Tamula								
Tamula								
Lake Tihu								
Lake Tikste	1.7							
Lake Toku	1.3							
Lake Tõhela	338.5	1.5	1.3					
Lake Tõlinõmme	6.5							
Lake Tooma								
Lake Tsäpsi								
Lake Tsopa								
Lake Tudu								
Ubajärv								
Uhtjärv								
Päidla Uibojärv	2.2	4.6		675	Valga, Otepää	Päidla Lake District		
Lake Ülemiste	940.9	4.2	2.5	15,219				
Lake Uljaste								
Umbjärv (Meeksi)								
Üvvärjärv								
Lake Vagula	602.8	11.5	5.3	17,838				
Vähajärv								
Neeruti Vahejärv	5.9							
Nelijärve Vahejärv	3.4							
Lake Vahtsõkivi	69.5	4.6			Võru County, Antsla Parish	artificial		
Väike-Aavoja Reservoir	5.5					part of Aavoja		
Päidla Väikejärv	2.8			600	Valga, Otepää	Päidla Lake District		
Väike Karujärv								
Lake Vaikne								
Väinjärv								
Valgjärv (Jeti)	44.1							
Valgjärv (Kose)								
Valgjärv (Rõuge)								
Valgjärv (Valgjärve)	60.0							
Valgõjärv	6.3							
Vällämäe Küläjärv								
Lake Vasavere	41.5							
Vaskjala Reservoir								
Vaskna								
Vasula	8.5							
Veisjärv	481.1	4.0	1.3	9,047				
Lake Verevi								
Veskijärv								
Lake Viisjaagu	23.0							
Virtsiku	2.1				Ida-Viru			
Viru Bog								
Lake Viitina								
Viitina								
Lake Viitna								
Viitna								
Lake Viljandi								
Viljandi								
Lake Virtsiku	2.1							
Virtsjärv	7.5							
Lake Vissi								
Võngjärv								
Vööla Sea								
Võrtsjärv	26,901.5	6.0	2.8	130,874				
