= Alajõe Parish =

Former municipality of Estonia

Coordinates: 59°00′45″N 27°25′45″E

Alajõe Parish Alajõe vald
- Former municipality
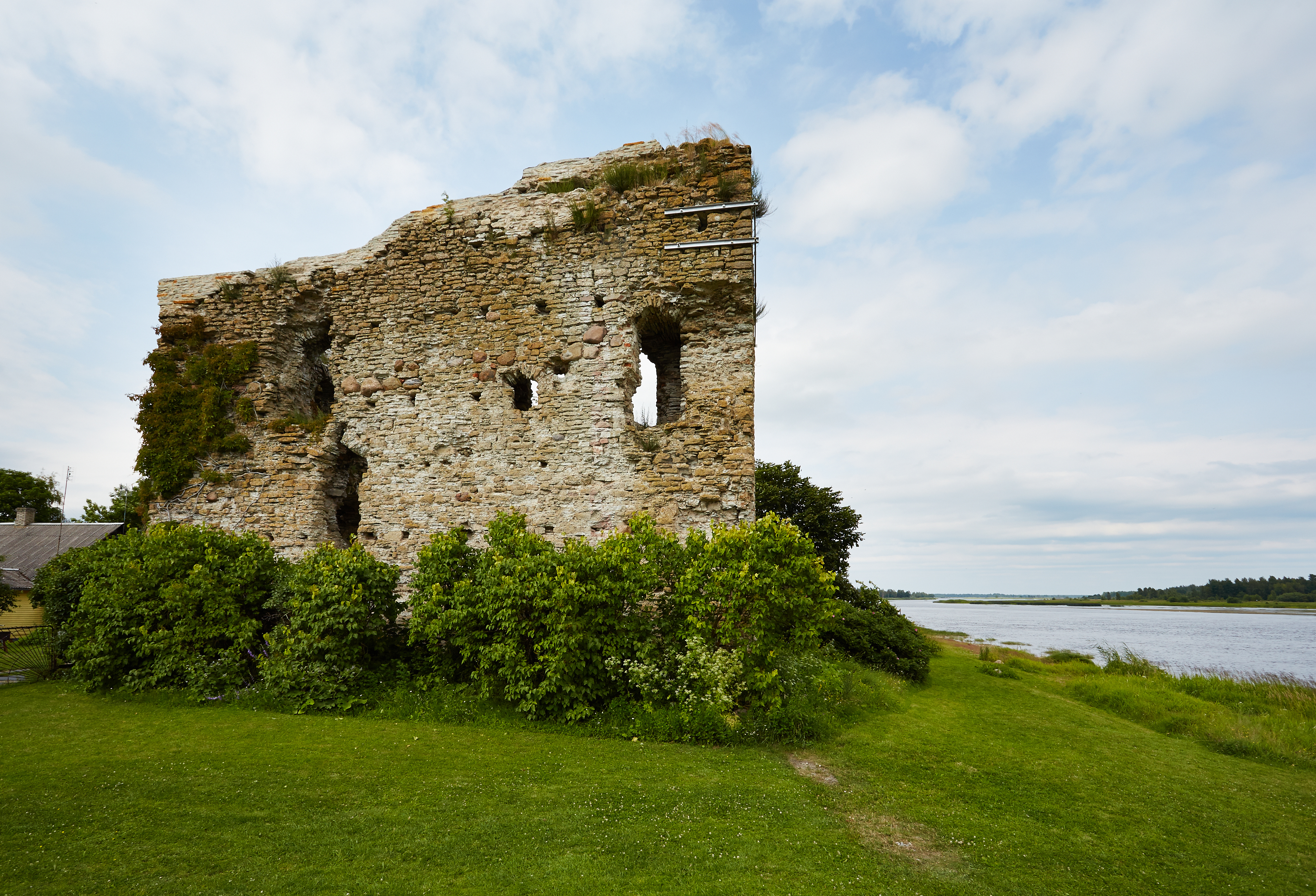
- Ruins of Vasknarva Castle

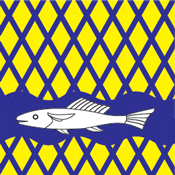
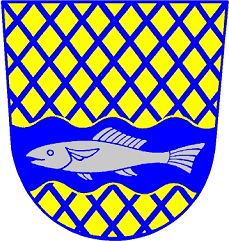
- Flag Coat of arms

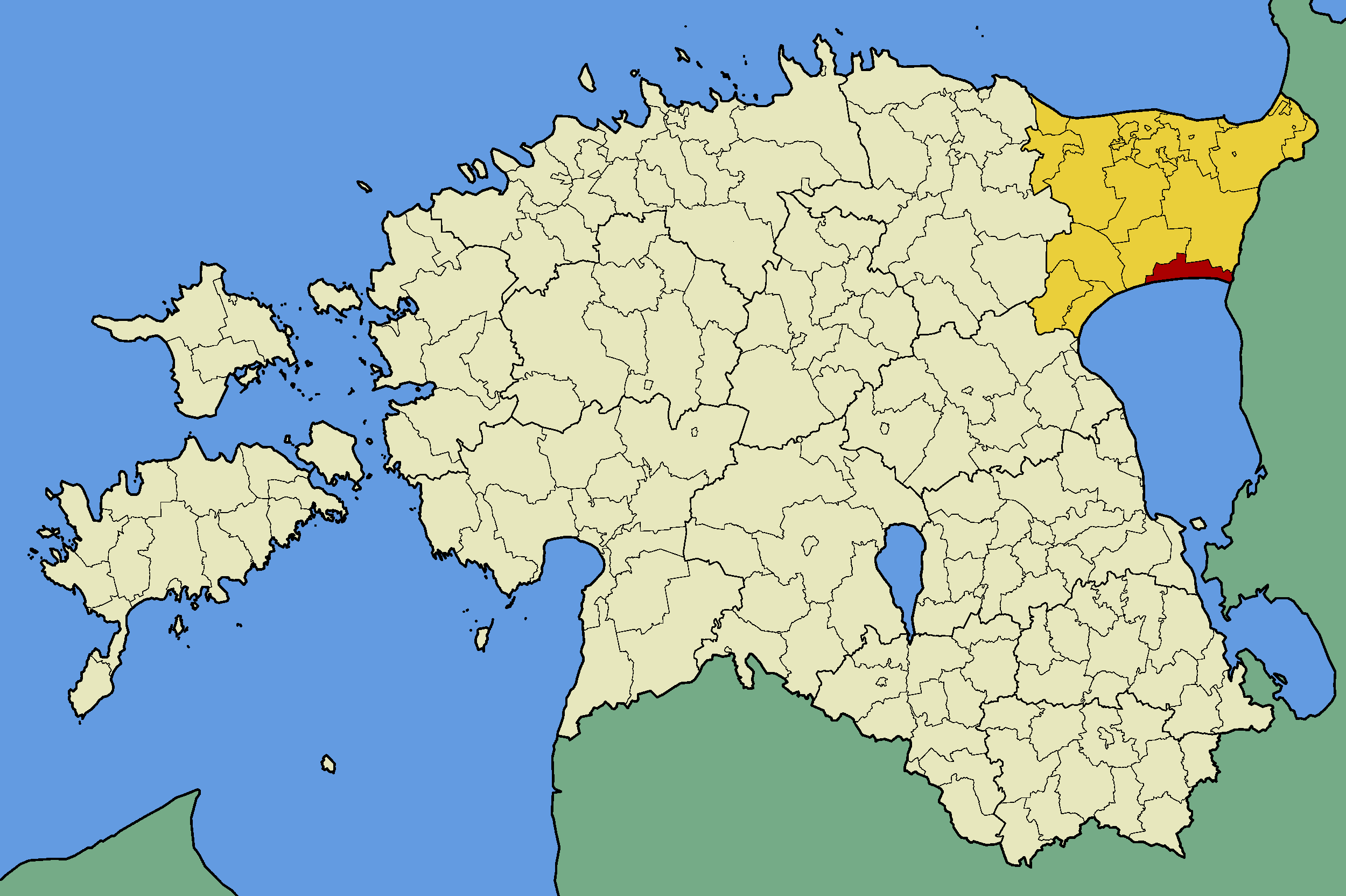
- Alajõe Parish within Ida-Viru County.
- Country: Estonia
- County: Ida-Viru County
- Administrative centre: Alajõe

Area
  - Total: 109.61 km^{2} (42.32 sq mi)

Population
  - Total: 1,024
  - Density: 9.342/km^{2} (24.20/sq mi)
- Website: www.alajoevv.ee

Alajõe Parish was a rural municipality of Ida-Viru County in northern Estonia. It had a population of 1024 and an area of 109.61 km^{2} (42 sq mi).

The municipality was merged with neighboring municipalities in 2017 as part of the Estonian local government administrative reform to form Alutaguse municipality.

It stretched along the northern coast of Lake Peipsi from Uusküla to the source of the Narva River. A large part of the population of the municipality were Peipsi Russians.

== Villages ==
Alajõe - Karjamaa - Katase - Remniku - Smolnitsa - Uusküla - Vasknarva
