= Uusküla =

Uusküla (Estonian for 'new village') may refer to several places in Estonia:

- Uusküla, Harju County, a village in Jõelähtme Parish, Harju County
- Uusküla, Ida-Viru County, a village in Alutaguse Parish, Ida-Viru County
- Uusküla, Lääne County, a village in Lääne-Nigula Parish, Lääne County
- Uusküla, Lääne-Viru County, a village in Haljala Parish, Lääne-Viru County
- Uusküla, Rapla County, a village in Rapla Parish, Rapla County
- Ulaskova, a village in Setomaa Parish, Võru County, also known as Uusküla
- Mari Uusküla (born 1980), Estonian linguist

== See also ==
- Vanaküla (disambiguation) (Estonian for 'old village'), several places in Estonia
