= Alajõe =

Alajõe may refer to several places in Estonia:

- Alajõe Parish, municipality in Ida-Viru County
- Alajõe, Ida-Viru County, village in Alutaguse Parish, Ida-Viru County
- Alajõe, Tartu County, village in Peipsiääre Parish, Tartu County
