= Vanaküla =

Vanaküla (Estonian for 'old village') may refer to:

== Places in Estonia ==
- Vanaküla, Harju County, village in Kuusalu Parish, Harju County
- Vanaküla, Lääne-Nigula Parish, village in Lääne-Nigula Parish, Lääne County, formerly in Martna Parish
- Vanaküla (Gambyn), village in Lääne-Nigula Parish, Lääne County, formerly in Noarootsi Parish
- Vanaküla, Põlva County, village in Põlva Parish, Põlva County
- Varudi-Vanaküla, village in Rakvere Parish, Lääne-Viru County
- Seretsüvä, village in Setomaa Parish, Võru County, also known as Vanaküla

== People ==
- Hannes Vanaküla (born 1966), Estonian magician

== See also ==
- Uusküla (disambiguation) (Estonian for 'new village'), several places in Estonia
