= Kamakura's Seven Entrances =

The Seven Entrances to Kamakura
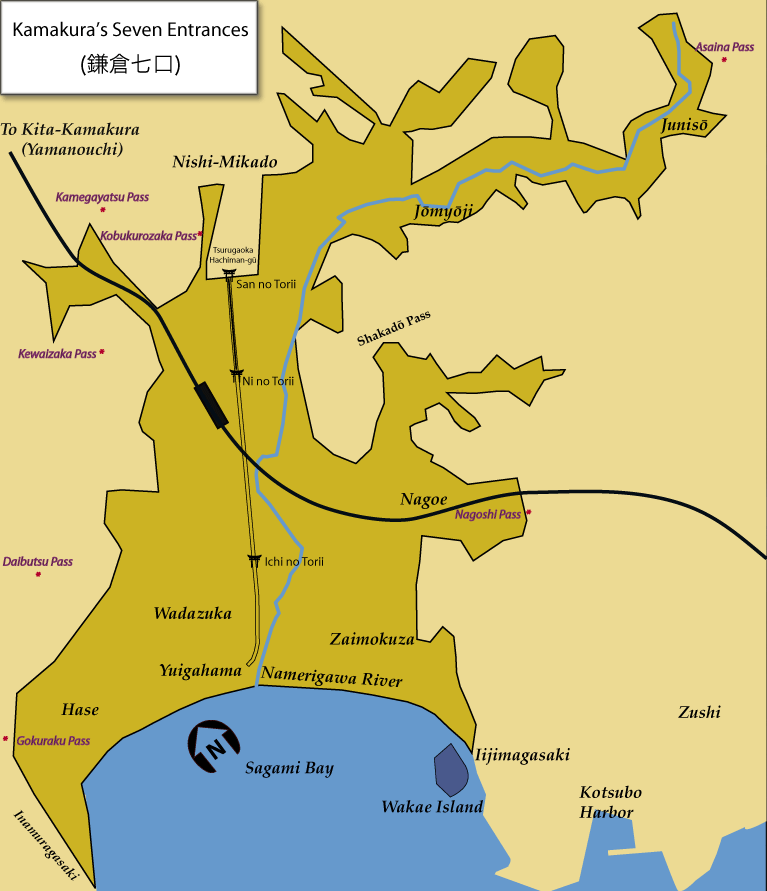
- Map of the Seven Entrances into Kamakura

- Location of Kamakura within Kanagawa Prefecture Kamakura's Seven Entrances (Japan)
- 35.3194°N 139.5500°E
- Type: Historic mountain passes
- Location: Kamakura, Kanagawa Prefecture, Japan

History
- Built: Kamakura period

The city of Kamakura, Kanagawa in Japan, is closed off on three sides by very steep hills and on the fourth by the sea: before the construction of several modern tunnels and roads, the so-called Seven Entrances (Nana-guchi), or Seven Passes (七切り通し, Nana-kiridoshi) (all artificial) were its main links to the rest of the world. The city was therefore a natural fortress and, according to the Azuma Kagami, it was chosen by Minamoto no Yoritomo as his base specifically for this reason.

The name itself seems to have been modeled on that of Kyoto's Seven Entrances (京都七口)—sometimes translated as the seven "mouths"—which first appears in the literature of the intermediate Muromachi period (around the year 1450). Together with the other "numbered" names like "Kamakura's Ten Wells" and "Kamakura's Ten Bridges", the modern "Seven Entrances" is an Edo period invention probably concocted to stimulate tourism. The Azuma Kagami calls them simply -zaka: Kobukurozaka, Daibutsuzaka, Gokurakuzaka, etc. Besides these seven, there were always other mountain roads that connected Kamakura with, for example, Kotsubo and Shichirigahama. There is one, for example, that connects Kaizō-ji in Ōgigayatsu with Kita-Kamakura Station. The Seven Entrances were simply the most convenient and important.

While economically vital because they allowed traffic to and from the outside world, the Seven Passes also had great military value, and as such they were fortified in various ways, for example narrowing them further until a horse could barely pass through, and obstructing the view of incomers. The roads were also modified adding artificial cliffs and forts from which archers could hit enemies below.

== The Seven Entrances ==
=== The Asaina Pass ===
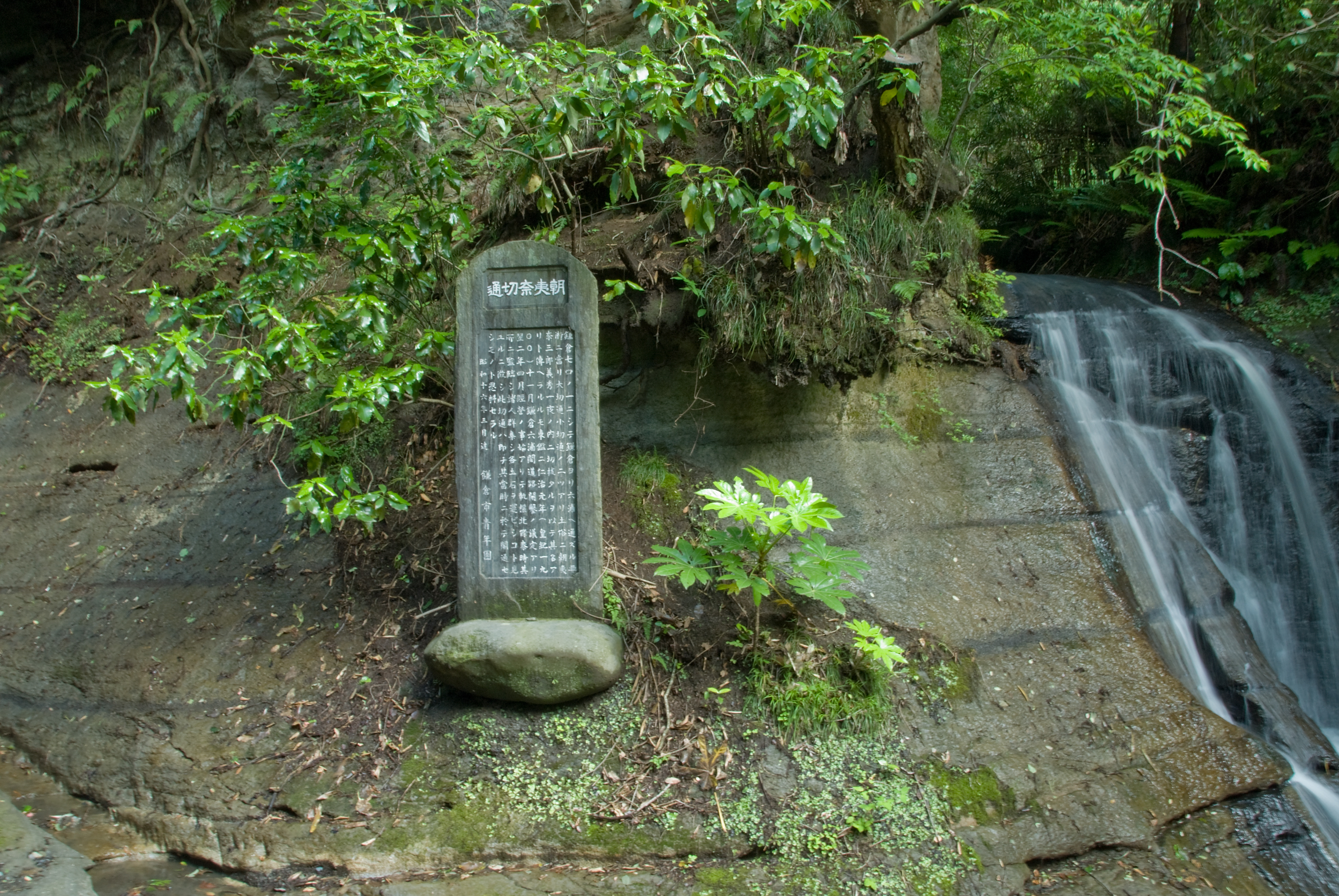
The Saburō Falls at the beginning of the Asaina Pass

Also known as Mutsuurakuchi (六浦口) and commonly called Asaina Pass (朝比奈切通), the Asaina Pass connected Kanazawa (today part of the city of Yokohama) to Kamakura, while at the same time protecting its eastern flank. The Azuma Kagami reports that the decision to link the city to Kanazawa was taken in 1240 by Shikken Hōjō Yasutoki. Its name seems to stem from the legend that superhuman hero Asahina (or Asaina) Saburō Yoshihide (a historical figure and Wada Yoshimori's third son) built it by himself in one night. The falls near the Kamakura entrance to the pass, the Saburō Falls (三郎滝), are also named after him. The whole pass has been declared a historical landmark.

The plaque on the Yokohama side of the pass says:

Historical Landmark - Asaina Pass (June 5, 1969)
In 1240 the Kamakura shogunate ordered works to improve communications between the city and the important center of Mutsuura, and construction was started in April of the following year.

The Shikken Hōjō Yasutoki himself directed the work and carried stones and dirt with his horse to speed it up.

Mutsuura was then a center of salt production and an important port for the distribution of goods not only to and from Kantō centers like Awa, Kazusa, and Shimōsa, but also Korea and China.

Goods coming from various places arrived here by ship and entered Kamakura through this pass, making Mutsuura a location of great political and economic importance.

On both sides of the pass are still visible the remains of fortifications (artificial cliffs and flat areas) built to defend it.

On the south of the border with Kamakura lies Kumano Jinja, built to guard the city's unlucky north-eastern direction.

It is the steepest of Kamakura's Seven Passes.

The Yokohama International Travel Association
The Yokohama Committee for Education, Cultural Properties Department, March 1990

The inscription on the stele on the Kamakura side of the pass, near the Saburō Falls, has a very similar content.

The Asaina Pass is located around coordinates 35.324806°N 139.586306°E.

=== The Daibutsu Pass ===
From above today's Daibutsu Tunnel, the Daibutsu Pass (大仏切通) passed through the localities of Kajiwara and Yamazaki to link Kamakura to Fujisawa. Its date of construction is unknown, and the Azuma Kagami doesn't mention it. A passage of the Shinpen Kamakurashi seems to indicate that it existed by 1181, but this is probably an error. Repaired many times in the period from the Edo period to the Meiji era, it has been declared a Historic Site.

=== The Gokuraku Pass ===
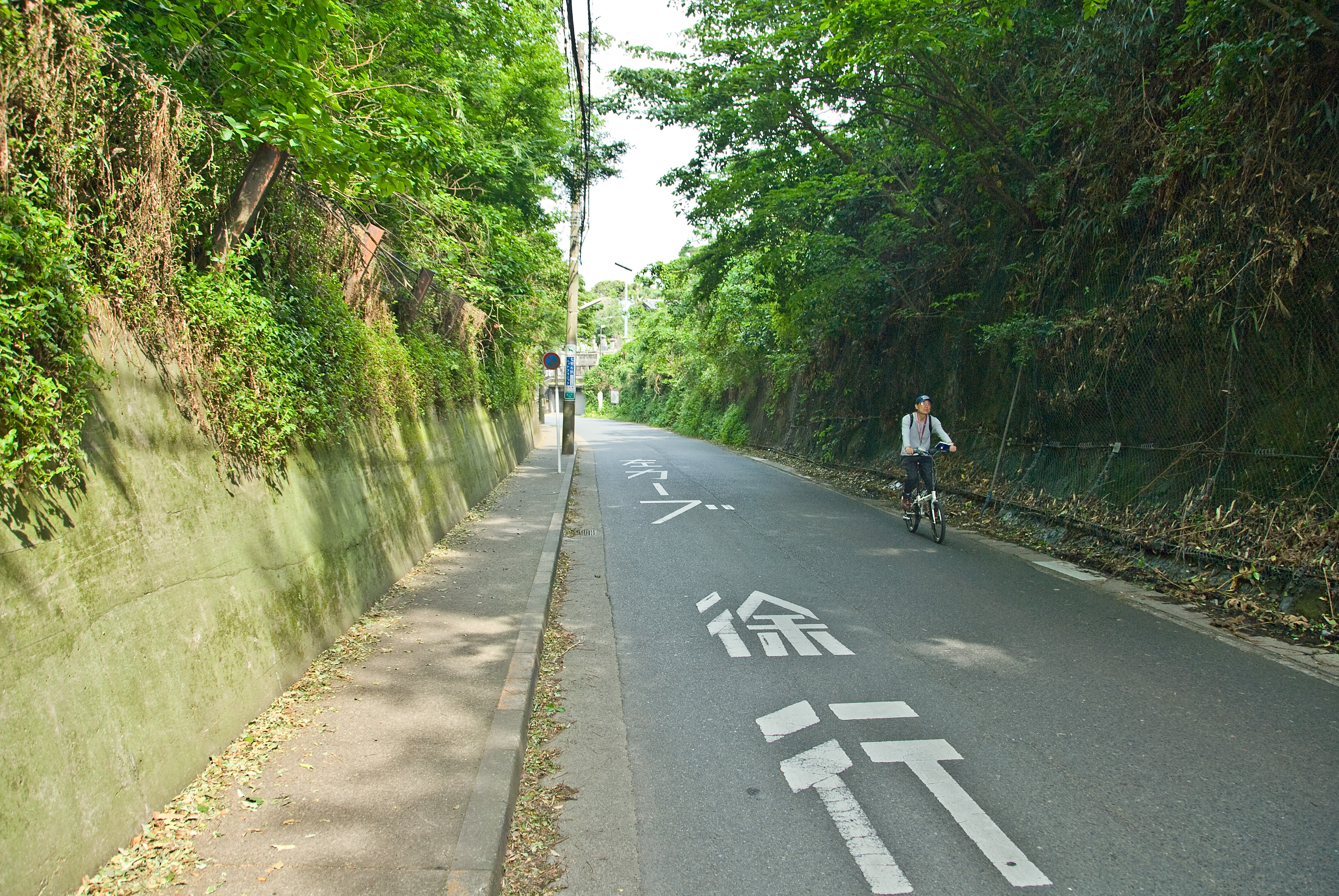
The Gokuraku Pass, where Nitta Yoshisada's army was repelled by the Hojo defences

The Gokuraku Pass (極楽寺切通) is a section of the road that, from the beach in Yuigahama, passes in front of Gokuraku-ji's gate, returns to the sea after Inamuragasaki, then goes on to Shichirigahama, Koshigoe, and Katase, ultimately joining the famous Tokaidō road. According to tradition, the pass was opened by the founder of Gokuraku-ji, Ninshō (1217–1303). The pass was chosen by Nitta Yoshisada for his 1333 attack on Kamakura and therefore saw ferocious fighting.

The stele on the pass says:

This place used to be a hill but Ninshō, the founder of Gokuraku-ji, had it flattened and opened this road. The so-called Gokuraku-ji Pass is this road. When in 1333 Nitta Yoshisada attacked Kamakura, the army's shoguns Ōdate Muneuji and Eda Yukiyoshi advanced with their forces along this road, and here they clashed with Kamakura's forces commanded by Osaragi Sadanao. This is the place where they camped and fought.

The Gokuraku Pass is located along the road at 35.309361°N 139.531444°E.

=== The Kamegayatsu Pass ===
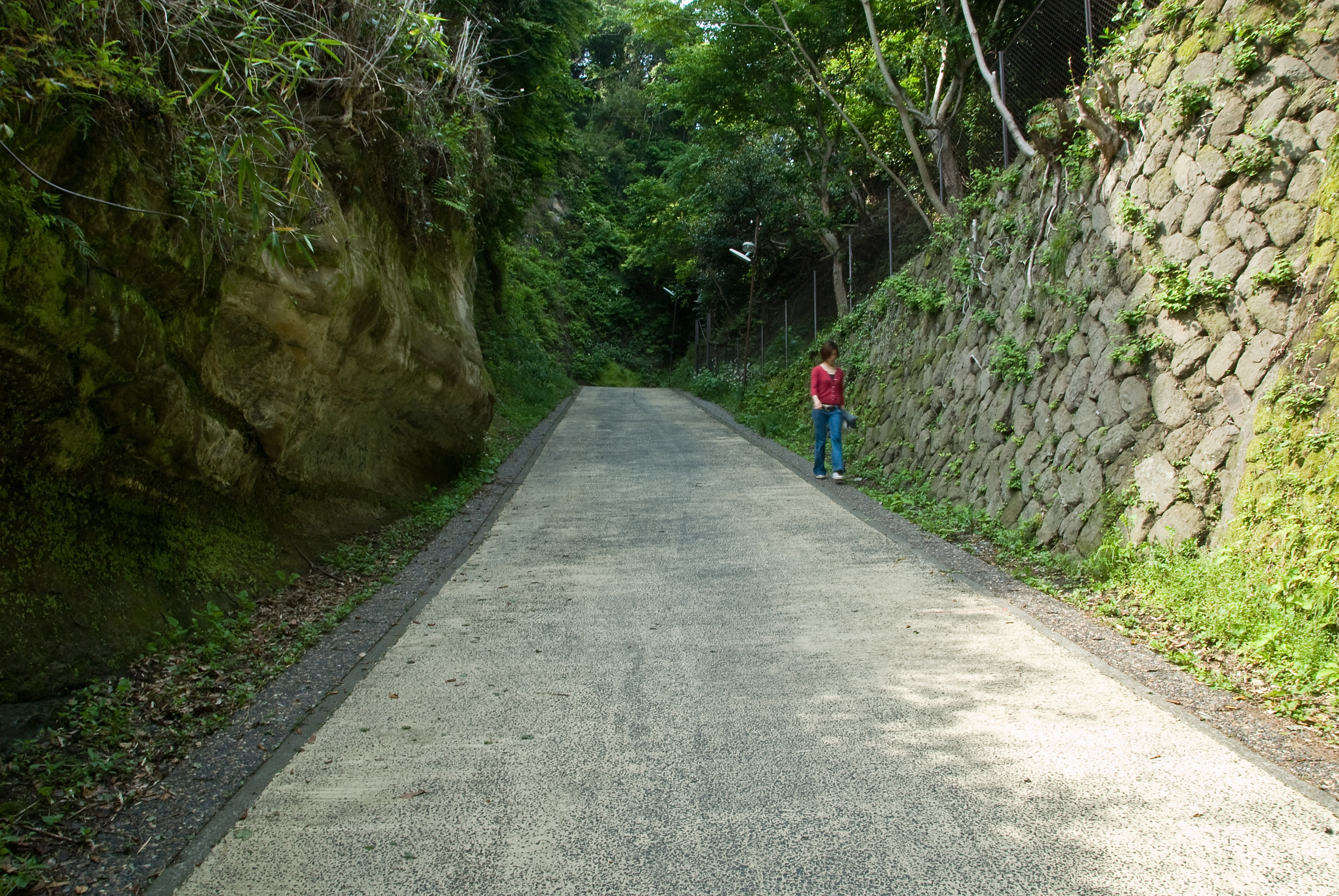
The Kamakura side of the Kamegayatsu Pass

The name Kamegayatsu Pass (亀ケ谷坂) first appears in the Azuma Kagami in 1180. The Kamegayatsu Pass connected the area of Ōgigayatsu (north-west of today's Kamakura station) to Chōju-ji in Yamanouchi (Kita-Kamakura), near Kenchō-ji. Its name comes from the fact it's so steep a turtle wouldn't be able to go up without turning over. It has been declared a historical landmark.

Kamegayatsu Pass is located around coordinates 35.330335°N 139.550561°E.

=== The Kewaizaka Pass ===
Militarily extremely important, the Kewaizaka Pass (仮粧坂) led to Fujisawa, then the road proceeded towards Musashi Province (the area round today's Fuchū and Kokubunji). Because of its strategic position, this is where Nitta Yoshisada's forces drove their main attack on the city. The pass saw fighting again in several occasions. It has therefore been declared a historical landmark.

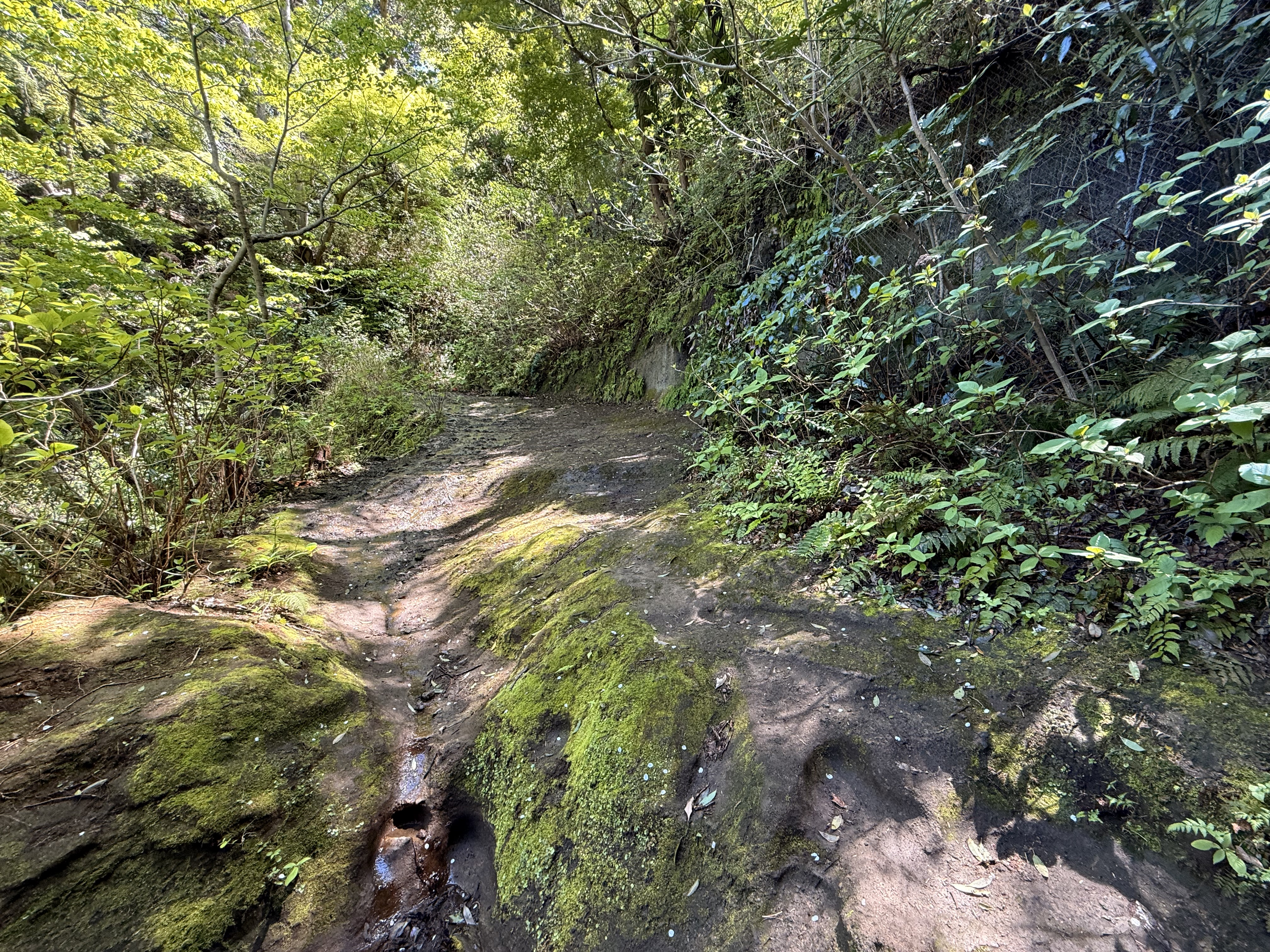
Kewaizaka Pass Entrance into Kamakura

The stele on the Kamakura side says:

The name of the Kewaizaka Pass can be written with the characters "化粧坂" or "形勢坂". According to one theory the name derives from the fact that once the shogun of the Taira clan was captured and makeup was applied to his severed head to make it easier to recognize. According to another, the name was born because a prostitute had her house at the bottom of the slope. In any case, in the Azuma Kagami the name never appears. This pass was one of Kamakura's Seven Entrances and was important for the defense of the city. Beginning with Nitta Yoshisada's invasion of 1333, it saw combat several times.

The Kewaizaka Pass is located in the within the area of Genjiyama Park around coordinates 35.325997°N 139.544983°E.

=== The Kobukurozaka Pass ===
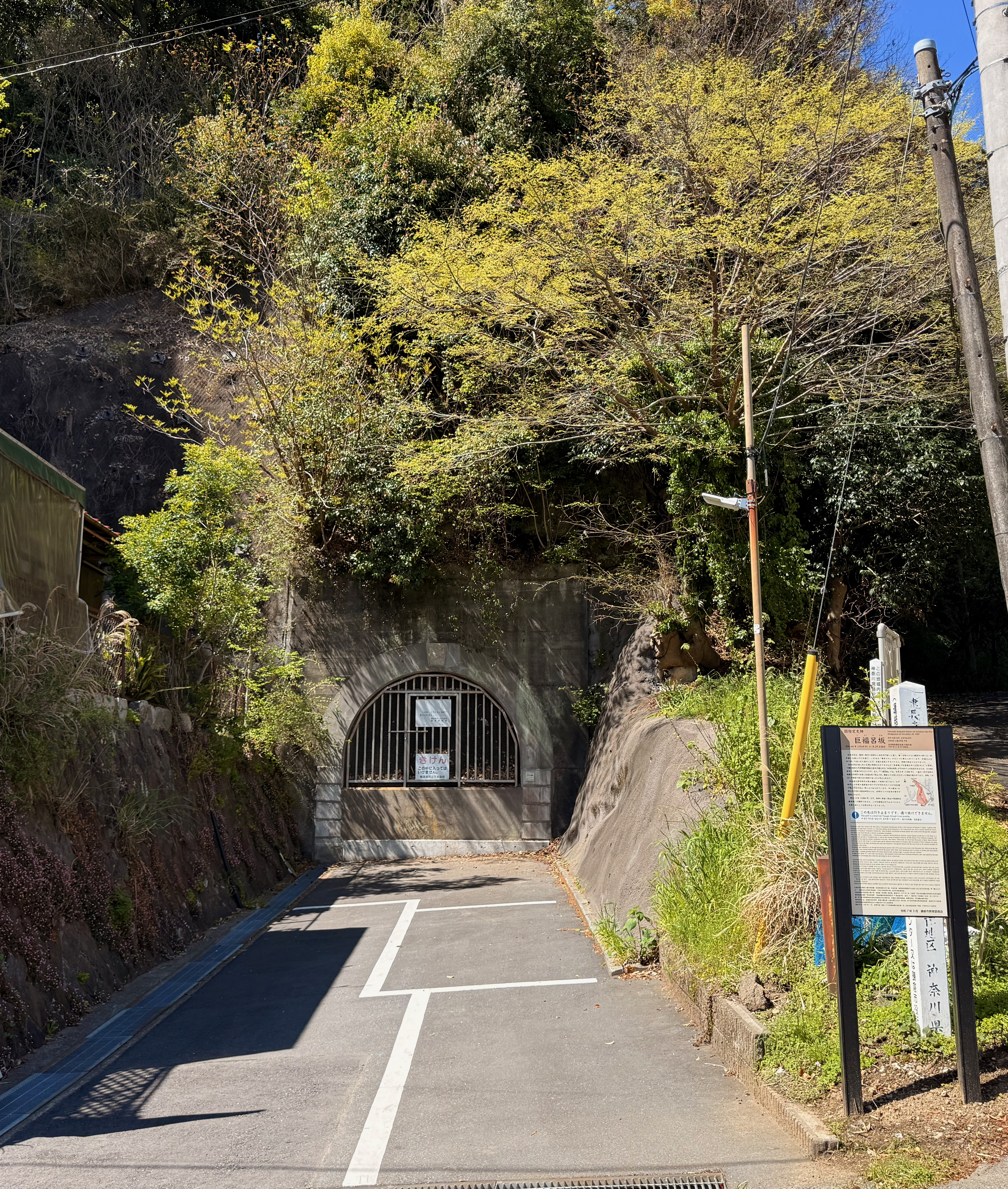
Kobukurozaka Pass

The name Kobukurozaka Pass (巨福呂坂 or 小袋坂) first appears in the Azuma Kagami in 1235. The old road that crosses the pass, which, from Tsurugaoka Hachiman-gū, leaves the modern road to Yamanouchi (Kita-kamakura), runs below it and rejoins it before Kenchō-ji, was built by the Hōjō Shikken. The modern road was built during the Meiji era. According to the Taiheiki, it is one of the passes through which Nitta Yoshisada tried to penetrate into Kamakura in 1333. The pass has been declared a historical landmark.

The plaque on site reads:

Kobukuro-zaka Pass connects the west side of Tsurugaoka Hachimangü Shrine to the entrance of Kenchö-ji Temple. Together with Kamegayatsu-zaka Pass, it served as a vital route linking central Kamakura to the Yamanouchi area and is counted among the "Seven Entrances to Kamakura" (Kamakura Nanakuchi). These kiridoshi (cut-through mountain passes) were roads carved through hills, designed not only to ease travel but also to function as defensive strongholds. The exact date of Kobukuro-zaka's construction is unknown, but the historical chronicle Azuma Kagami records that in 1235 (Katei 1), a religious ritual was held at "Kobukuro-zaka" to pray for the recovery of Fujiwara Yoritsune, the fifth shogun of the Kamakura shogunate. This suggests that the road was already established in the early 13th century. Additionally, the Illustrated Biography of Ippen (Ippen Hijirie) depicts a scene in 1282 (Köan 5) in which Ippen and his followers were stopped at Kobukuro-zaka by retainers of Höjo Tokimune, the ruling regent (shikken) at the time, preventing their entry into Kamakura. This episode indicates that the area served as the northern boundary of Kamakura in that period. Kobukuro-zaka remained in use through the Muromachi period (1336-1573), and records such as the Fukuyama Jöju Nikki reveal that the road surface was lowered multiple times during the Edo period (1603-1868). Stone monuments such as Köshin-to (Köshin faith stone pillars) and Dösojin (roadside guardian deities) still remain along the path, evoking images of travelers from past centuries. In May 1886 (Meiji 19), a new road-now known as the Kanagawa Prefectural Road Yokohama-Kamakura Line-was opened to the east, rendering the cut-through pass a dead end and ending its role as a main route.

The location of Kobukurozaka Pass is around coordinates 35.32741944°N 139.55453611°E

=== The Nagoe Pass ===
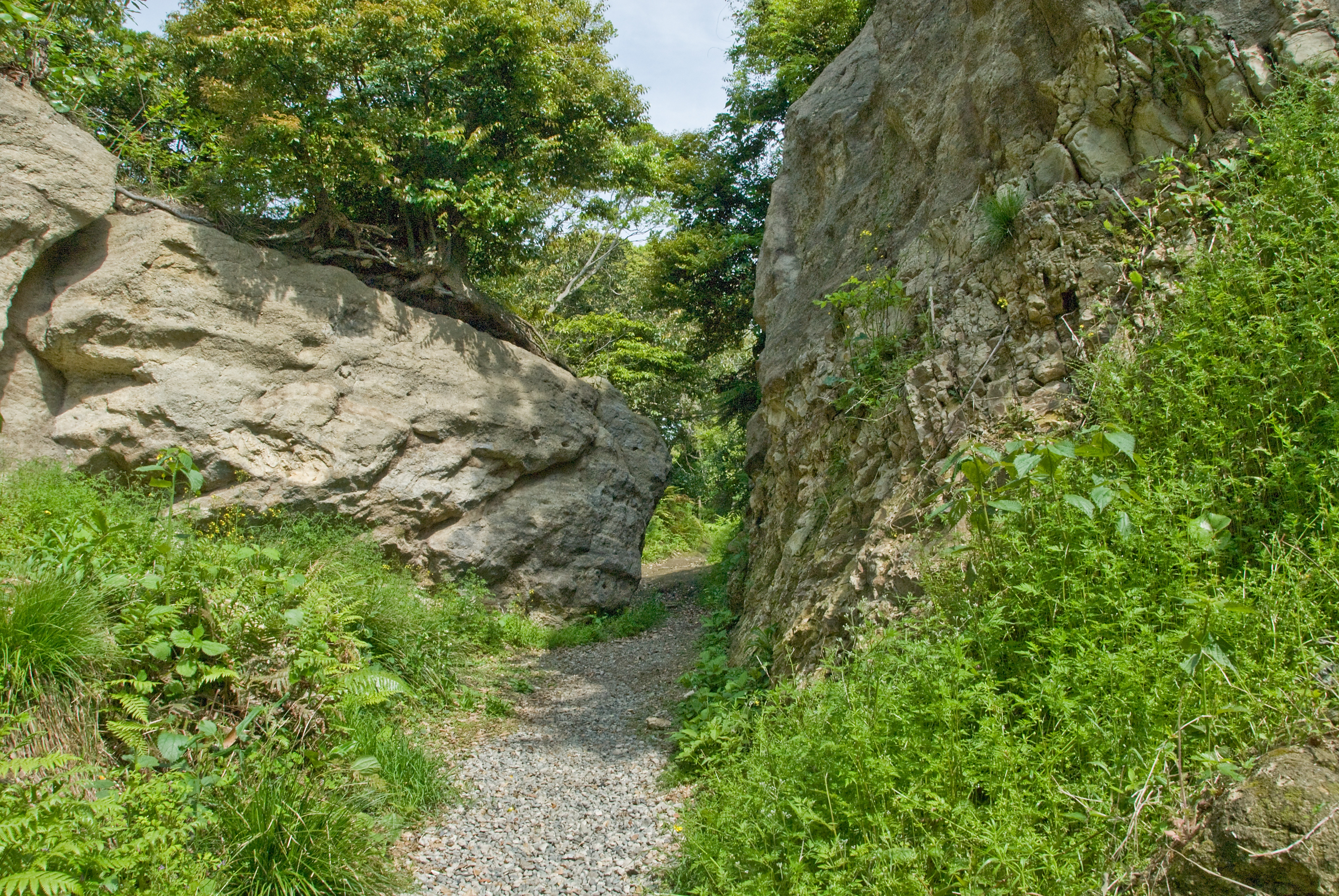
The Nagoe Pass, important because it linked Kamakura to the Miura Peninsula, is less than 2 meters wide

The Nagoe Pass (名越切通) was extremely important because it linked the city to the Miura Peninsula. Very steep and less than two meters across, its name was originally written with the characters 難通 (difficult to pass) for this reason. The name of the area around it is now written with the same characters (名越), but called Nagoe. It has been declared a historical landmark.

The plaque on the Kamakura side says:

Once the Kamakura shogunate was established, to allow trade during peacetime and defense in case of war, it opened seven passes. The Nagoe Pass still remains close to its original form. On the Zushi side, in several point along the road are still visible the remains of artificial cliffs added to complement the place's natural geography and ensure an easy defense.
March 1981, The Kanagawa Committee for Education

=== Present condition of the Seven Entrances ===
Today's Kobukurozaka Pass is a modern, wide road that connects Kamakura to Kita-Kamakura and only traces are left of the old pass. The Gokuraku Pass is now also a road. More or less like they were before the Meiji era are the Daibutsu, Nagoshi, and Asaina Passes, while the Kewaizaka and Kamegayatsu Passes have changed, but are still recognizable.

== The Shakadō Pass ==
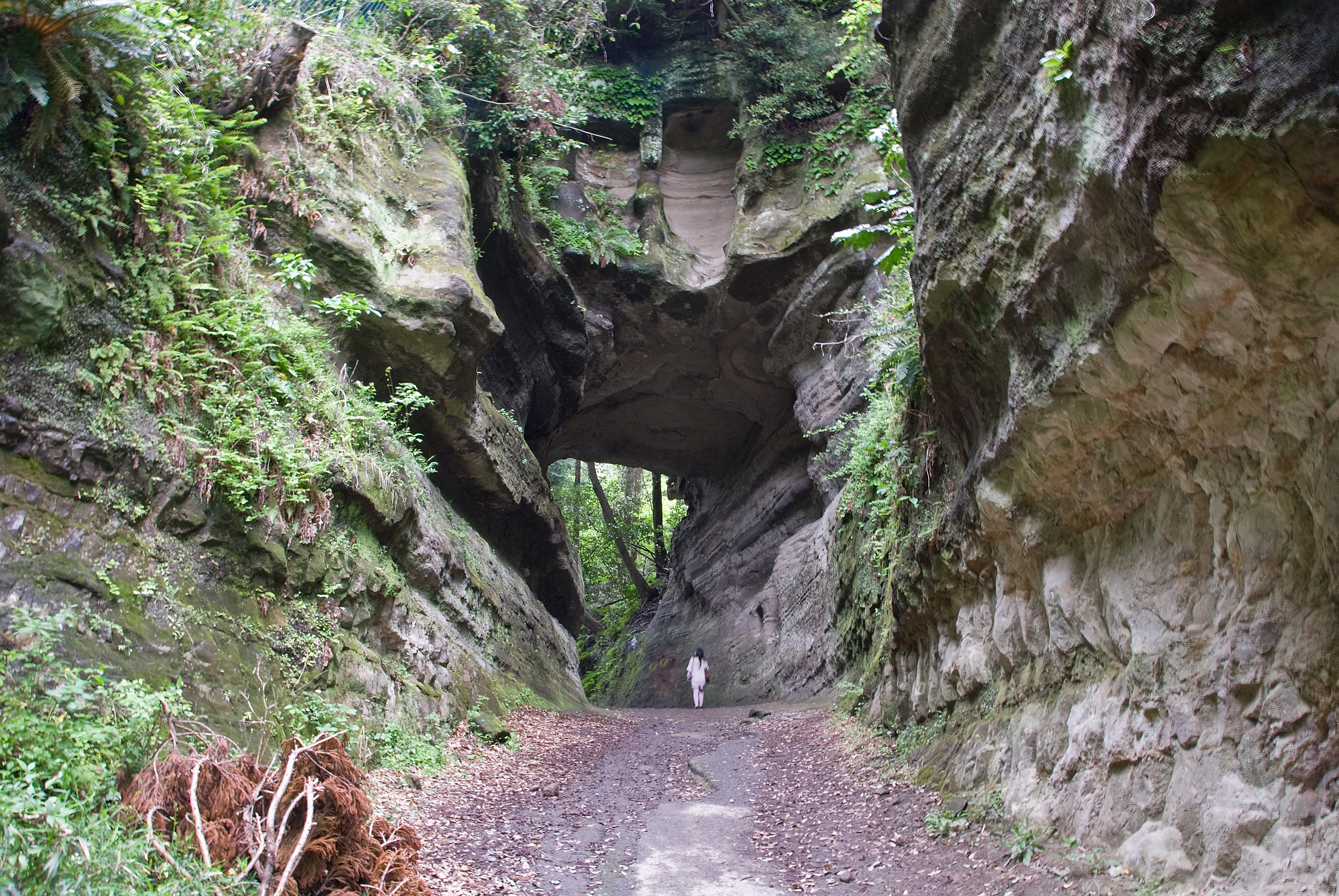
The Ōmachi side of the majestic Shakadō Pass

Besides the Seven Entrances there is another great pass in the city, the huge Shakadō Pass (釈迦堂切通) which connects Shakadōgayatsu to the Ōmachi and Nagoe (formerly called Nagoshi) districts. Although important, it was not considered one of the Entrances because it connected two areas both fully within Kamakura.

The pass is closed to all traffic because of the danger posed by falling rocks.
