= Toomas Vitsut =

Estonian politician

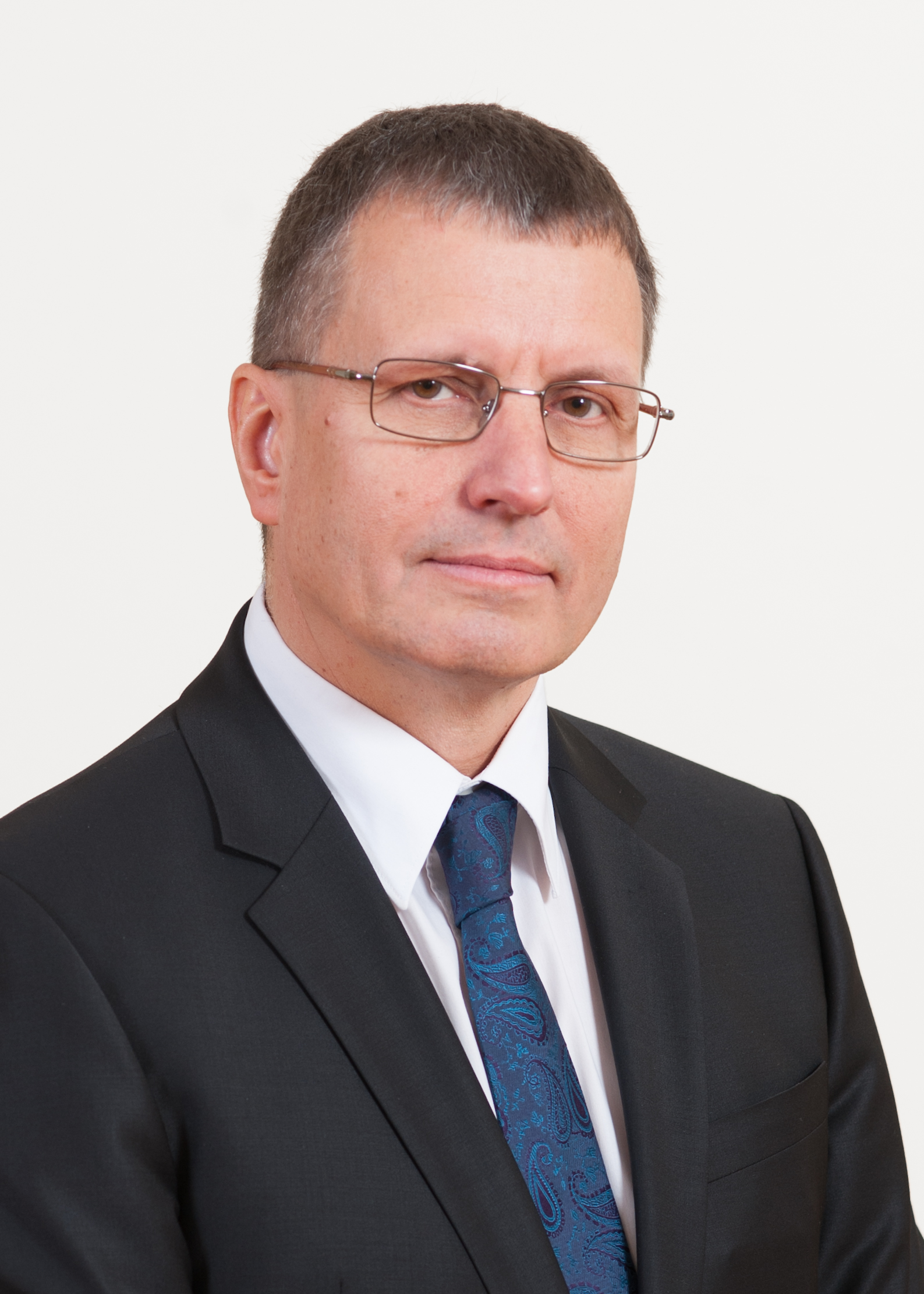
- Vitsut in 2015
- Born: 1 January 1960 (age 66); Tallinn, Estonia
- Education: University of Tallinn
- Occupation: Chairman of the City Council of Tallinn
- Political party: Estonian Centre Party
- Website: Official blog

Toomas Vitsut (born 1 January 1960) is an Estonian politician, and as appointed chairman of the City Council of Tallinn in 2005. He is also the founder of the institutional round table for resolving the ethnic tensions caused by the conflict around controversial Bronze Soldier statue in Tallinn. Vitsut was born in Tallinn and belongs to the Estonian Centre Party.

== Bronze Soldier ==
The decision of the Estonian government to remove the memorial and the remnants of the 13 Soviet soldiers to a military cemetery on the outskirts of Tallinn sparked off protest by the Russian-speaking population in Estonia at the end of April 2007. The protests of the defenders of the statue turned into riots with the police during the attempt to dismantle the memorial overnight. The Russian parliament threatened Estonia with trade sanctions and with breaking off diplomatic relations and pro-Putin activists picketed the Estonian embassy in Moscow.

The Estonian daily Postimees quoted Toomas Vitsut on 4 July 2006 as follows: "The current situation, when the police constantly guards part of the city centre of Tallinn, is not normal. The declarations of some politicians who have supported the dismantling the statue and undigging the graves is the source of instability and uncertainty. Moving this statue needs the political consensus and the capital should be a lighthouse of the conciliation for the whole society." Vitsut proposed to convene the round table for resolving the ethnic conflict, which had to consist of every side of the debate: his proposal was accepted and this assembly was created.

In the round table were represented all lobby groups of the Bronze Soldier topic: the veterans of the German and Soviet armies, a small group of Russophones Nochnoy Dozor (Night Watch), the Estonian nationalists, the representatives of Tallinn and Estonian Republic. As Vitsut remembered later, this assembly was very quarrelsome: "The old veterans of both sides were calm and wanted to resolve this case quietly, trying together to find a new place for the statue. But the young politicians and political wannabes were furious and uncompromised – they tried to escalate the conflict even more serious. There were a minority of mindful voices and that business ended up involving the vandalism in Tallinn´s city-centre."

== Proposed banking reform ==
As the Chairman of the City Council of Tallinn, Vitsut proposed to dissipate risks of the Estonian mortgage lenders by the government securities. According to Vitsut, Ginnie Mae in the US market would be a good example for Estonia. Estonia has only half of the GDP per capita of the US level, but the unemployment rate is comparable with US. The efforts of the Estonian economy lead this country to the real estate bubble in 2007, when Vitsut made his proposal. "Not every family is able to take a risky mortgage loan with high and unfixed interest rates and the state would guarantee mortgages for a lender through the national loan associations," Vitsut said. Vitsut emphasized that 33 million low income individuals in the US received government benefits to get their homes, which is not possible in ultra-liberal Estonia. This statement could not get the attention of the public, because it was made by a representative of the opposition.

== Balkan Star ==
In February 2011 it was stated in Estonian TV program Pealtnägija (Spectator) that a ship Balkan Star, which belonged to Vitsut exported explosives to Mediterranean countries, including Libya. Vitsut did not deny the allegations.
