= Karjamaa =

Karjamaa may refer to several places in Estonia:

- Karjamaa, Ida-Viru County, village in Alajõe Parish, Ida-Viru County
- Karjamaa, Tallinn, subdistrict of Tallinn
