= Shichirigahama =

Beach in Kanagawa prefecture, Japan

Coordinates: 35°18′18.42″N 139°30′38.67″E

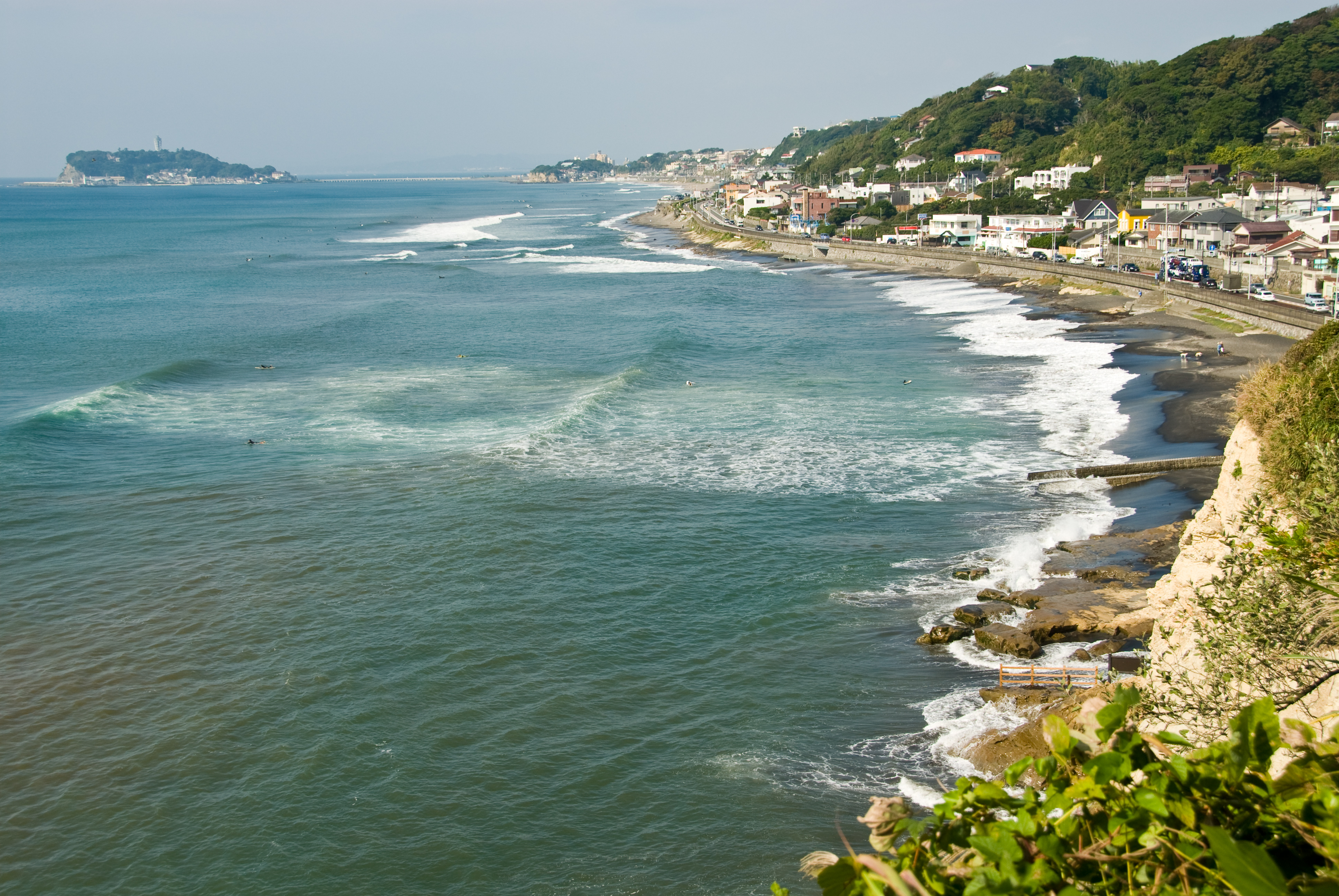
Shichirigahama seen from Inamuragasaki with Koyurugimisaki Cape and Enoshima in the background

Shichirigahama (七里ヶ浜) is a beach near Kamakura, Kanagawa Prefecture, Japan, which goes from Koyurugimisaki Cape, near Fujisawa, to Inamuragasaki Cape, west of Kamakura. Since from it one could enjoy a clear view of both Mount Fuji and Enoshima at the same time, during the Edo period it was popular as a subject for ukiyo-e. For example, famous ukiyo-e artists Hiroshige and Hokusai both include it in their 36 Views of Mount Fuji. Its dark sands are rich in iron ore which allowed Kamakura to become a florid center for the production of swords and knives. Its name is usually translated into English as "Seven Ri Beach", the ri being a unit of measurement.

Unlike its easterly neighbor Yuigahama, its floor drops too quickly, so it is not very popular as a sea resort, but surfers are present in every season. Since 1939 it is administratively part of the City of Kamakura. The area is served by the Enoshima Electric Railway, or Enoden, which connects Kamakura Station in Kamakura with Fujisawa Station.

== Etymology of the name ==
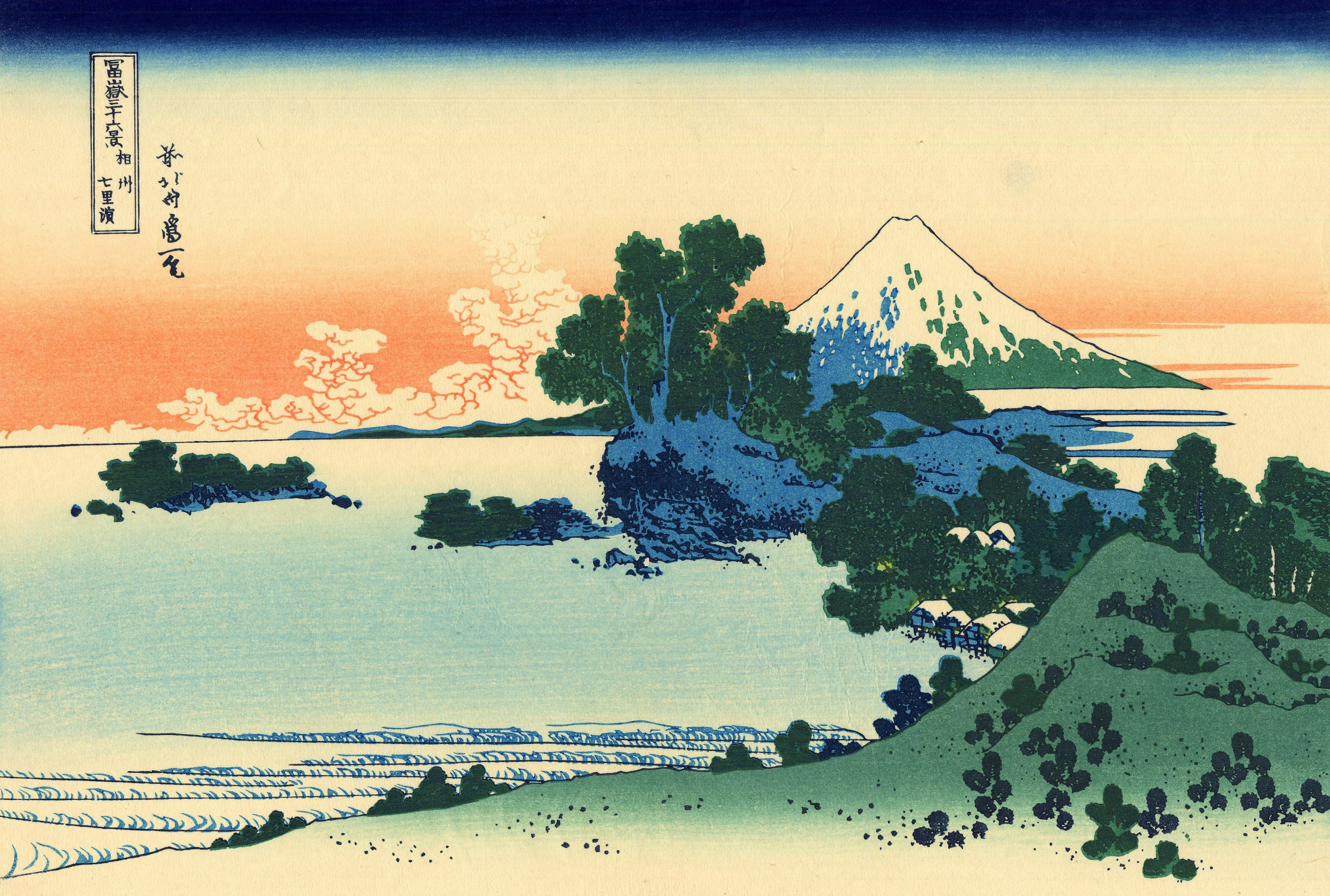
Shichirigahama seen from Inamuragasaki in a print by Hokusai, with Enoshima and Mount Fuji in the background

The beach's name means "Seven Ri Beach", where a ri is an old Japanese unit of measurement equivalent to 3.9 km (2.4 mi), and therefore Shichirigahama should be about 27 km (17 mi) long. In fact, it is just over one tenth of that length. The origin of the name is unknown, and many hypothetical etymologies exist. According to a passage of the Shinpen Kamakurashi, it comes from the Shichiri Bikyaku (七里飛脚) (a term usually shortened into just Shichiri), which was an Edo period messenger service on the Kantōdō highway with a horseman change every seven "ri". However, since the expression shichiri also meant "a long ride", the name could also just mean that the beach is very long. Shichirigahama has also been called Shichirinada (七里灘), Shichibama (七里浜) and Shichiriura (七里浦).

== History ==
Although not part of Kamakura proper since it lies outside the city's Seven Entrances, the entire area from Katase to Inamuragasaki represents a historically important area just outside the former military capital. According to the Azuma Kagami and the Shinpen Kamakurashi, Shichirigahama was the Kamakura shogunate's execution ground. It was also the scene of many battles, and records show that in the Edo period bones and rusty weapons were still being recovered from its sand.

=== Minamoto no Yoshitsune's letter from Koshigoe ===
Minamoto no Yoritomo's famous younger half-brother Yoshitsune, celebrated in Japan in Noh and Kabuki plays for both his bravery and his death, served the shōgun faithfully for years, leading the Minamoto clan in defeating the Taira clan, but for several reasons couldn't avoid a confrontation with him. After some victories, he tried to enter Kamakura, but was stopped at Koshigoe by a letter from Hōjō Tokimasa. He waited fruitlessly about 20 days at Koshigoe's Manpuku-ji, near Shichirigahama, then dictated to his attendant Benkei a letter for Yoritomo destined to become famous, the "Letter from Koshigoe", in which he complained that he had never betrayed his brother, but to the contrary had always faithfully served him. He had won for him important victories, but had received nothing but reproach and diffidence in return. Yoritomo didn't relent, so Yoshitsune gave up and left Koshigoe for Kyoto. The letter originally appears in the Azuma Kagami and is not believed to have been penned by Yoshitsune. It probably does however reflect his true feelings.

The feud between brothers continued until a fugitive Yoshitsune was forced to kill himself. His six-week-old head preserved in liquor was then brought to the shōgun, who accepted it in Koshigoe in 1182. Yoshitsune is enshrined in Shirahata Jinja in Fujisawa.

=== Inamuragasaki ===
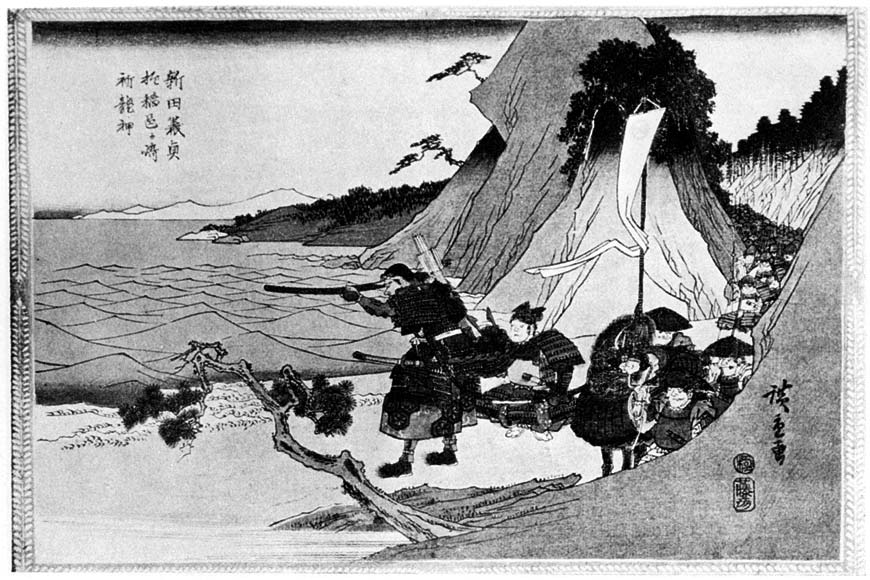
"Nitta Yoshisada at Inamuragasaki" by Hiroshige

Emperor loyalist Nitta Yoshisada in 1333 invaded Kamakura, deposing its Regent Hōjō Takatoki and ending the 145-year old Kamakura shogunate. According to the legend, being unable to defeat Kamakura defenses on land, he went down to Shichirigahama and, at the impassable cape of Inamuragasaki, prayed to the god Ryūjin to withdraw the waves and let him through.

The stele at Sode no Ura (袖の浦), the tiny bay west of Inamuragaki, reads:

666 years ago on May 21, 1333 Nitta Yoshisada, judging Kamakura's invasion on land to be difficult, decided to try to bypass this cape. This is the place where, according to tradition, he threw his golden sword into the waves, praying to the sea-god to withdraw them and let him pass.
(Stele erected in 1917)

=== Nichiren in Shichirigahama ===
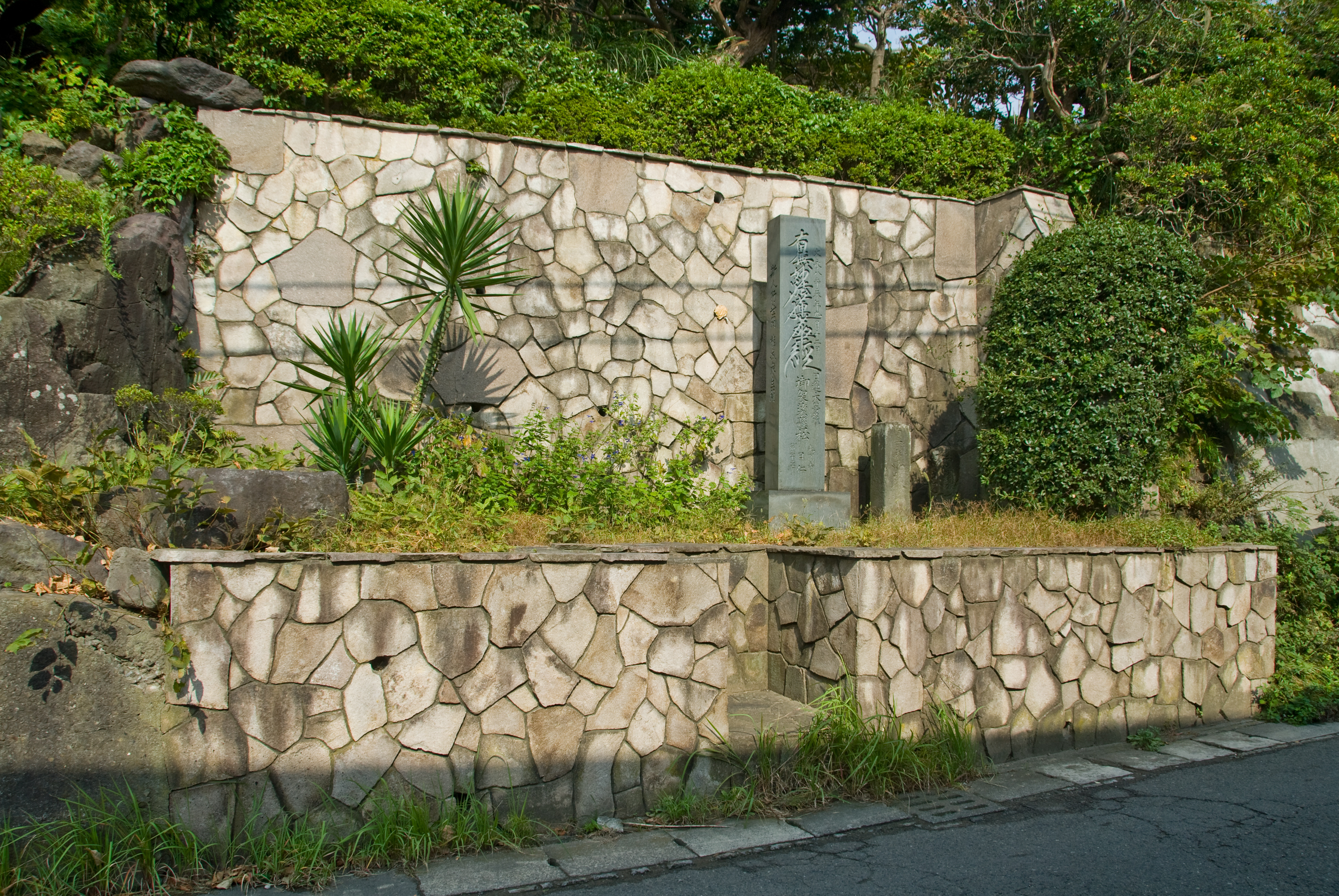
The monument to Nichiren where the Nichiren Kesagake no Matsu used to stand

Nichiren Buddhism was born in Kamakura, and the city is rich in places tied to both Nichiren and his life. Several of them are in Shichirigahama. This is because one of the shogunate's execution grounds was in Katase near Fujisawa in the spot where now Ryūkō-ji is, so, when Nichiren was condemned to death, he had to be brought there. Nichiren had been condemned for having written his Risshō Ankoku Ron, judged to be subversive by authorities. A miracle however saved him, because when he was about to be beheaded (an event known to Nichiren's followers as the Tatsunokuchi Persecution (龍ノ口法難)), lightning struck his executioner. Nichiren was ultimately pardoned and an order was sent to Katase to stop the execution.

==== Reikō-ji ====
Reikō-ji (霊光寺) and its Tanabegaike Pond (田辺が池) were the scene of one of Nichiren's miracles. In a period of extreme drought, after the famous priest Ninshō had already failed he successfully prayed the gods for rain. For this reason, the pond is also known as Amagoinoike (雨乞の池, or "Rain-prayer Pond").

==== Nichiren's pine tree ====
The so-called Nichiren Kesagake no Matsu (日蓮袈裟掛けの松) was a pine tree on the road to Katase from which Nichiren hanged his kesa (a Buddhist stole) while on his way to Ryūkō-ji so that it wouldn't be soiled by his blood. The original pine tree died long ago, and has been replaced many times by the faithful. Today, however, there is no pine tree and only a stele is left.

==== Yukiaibashi Bridge ====
The Yukiaibashi Bridge (行合川, "Meeting-each-other Bridge") is a small bridge near Enoden's Shichirigahama's station built on the spot where a messenger carrying Nichiren's pardon met the messenger bound in the opposite direction to announce his miraculous salvation.

=== Koyurugimisaki ===
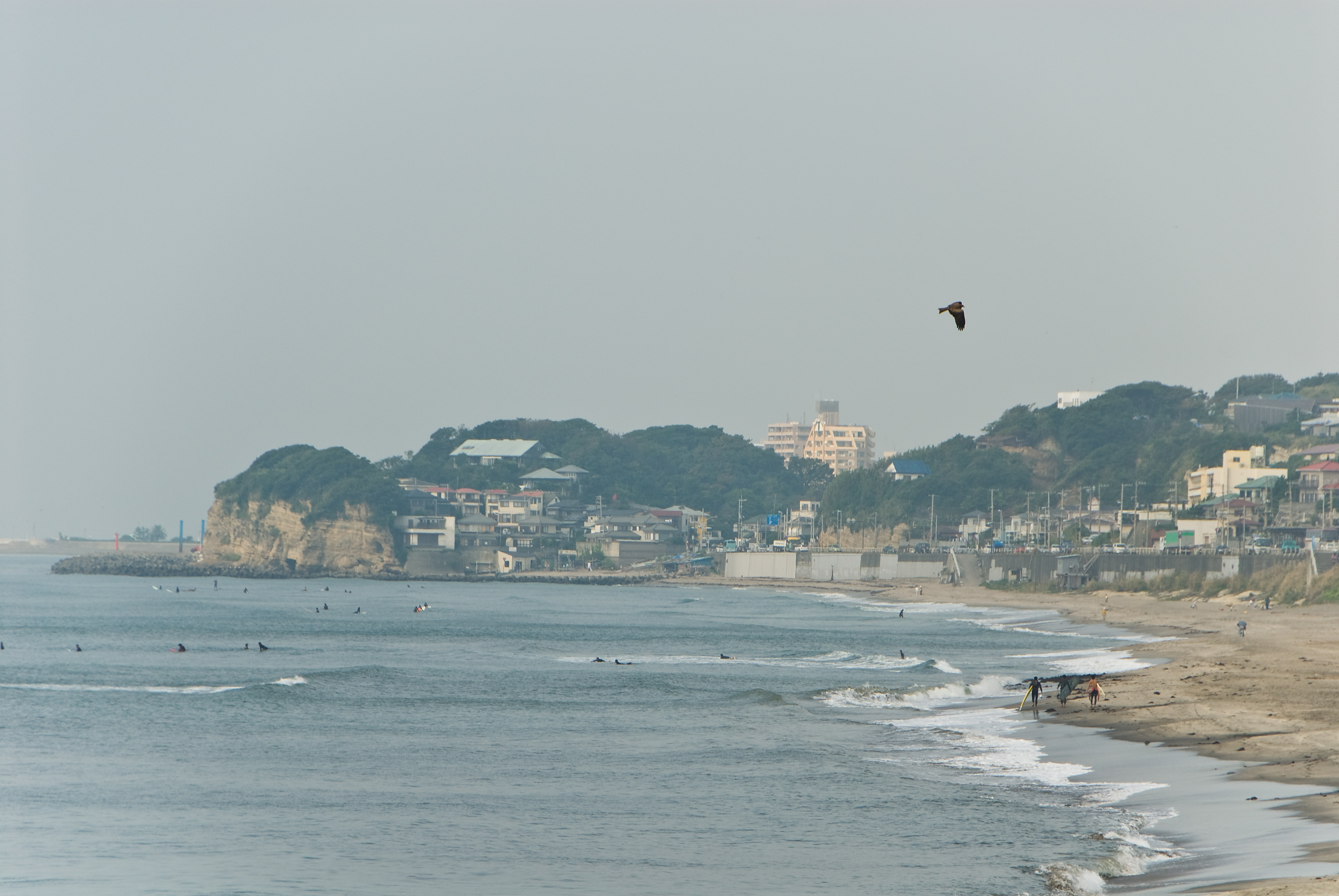
Koyurugimisaki Cape

At the western end of the beach another cape, similar in size and shape to Inamuragasaki, juts into the sea. It's called Koyurugimisaki (小動岬) ("Small Movement Cape"), and on it stands a small Shinto shrine called Koyurugi Jinja. Once again, the origin of its unusual name is unknown.

One legend says that, during the Edo period, on it stood a pine tree which shook even when there was no wind, producing an extremely pleasant sound as if a celestial creature was playing an instrument. According to another, the founder of the shrine, who was a Kamakura period samurai called Sasaki Moritsuna, saw the pine tree move very slightly and emit sounds like those of a koto, so he gave the cape its name.

Nitta Yoshisada stopped at Koyurugi Jinja in 1333 to pray for victory. Having won, he came back to offer a sword and some money to the shrine, with which the shinden was later restored. The shrine used to be called Hachiōji-gū (八王子宮) from the name of Koshigoe's tutelary spirit (chinju (鎮守/鎮主)), but its name was changed during the shinbutsu bunri (the forced separation of Buddhism and Shinto in temples and shrines) in the Meiji era. Later, in 1909, it was fused with another shrine, and for that reason it now enshrines kami Takeminakata no Mikoto.
