= Kersna =

Kersna is a surname. Notable people with the surname include:

- Heino Kersna (1922–2007), Estonian graphic artist and book illustrator
- Liina Kersna (born 1980), Estonian journalist, civil servant and politician
- Vahur Kersna (born 1962), Estonian journalist
