= Inamuragasaki =

Headland in Kamakura, Japan

Coordinates: 35°18′6″N 139°31′32″E

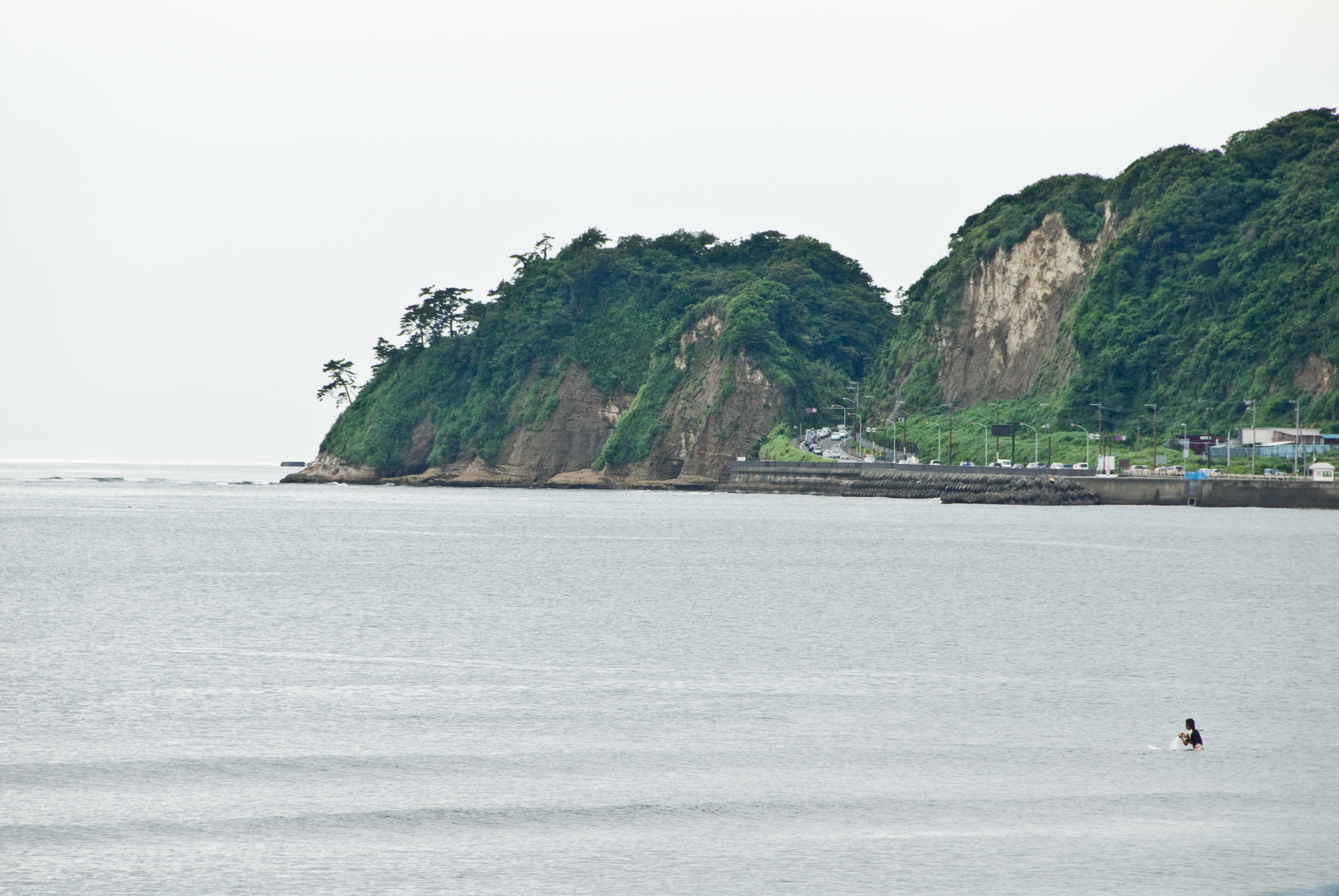
The Kamakura side of Inamuragasaki.

Inamuragasaki (稲村ケ崎) is a cape at the western end of Yuigahama (Beach) in Kamakura, Kanagawa Prefecture, Japan. The cape divides Yuigahama from Shichirigahama (Beach) and Enoshima. Its name seems to stem from its shape, similar to a stack of rice at harvest time (an inamura (稲叢)). At its foot on the Shichirigahama side there is a park, the Inamuragasaki Park (稲村ケ崎海浜公園).

== History ==
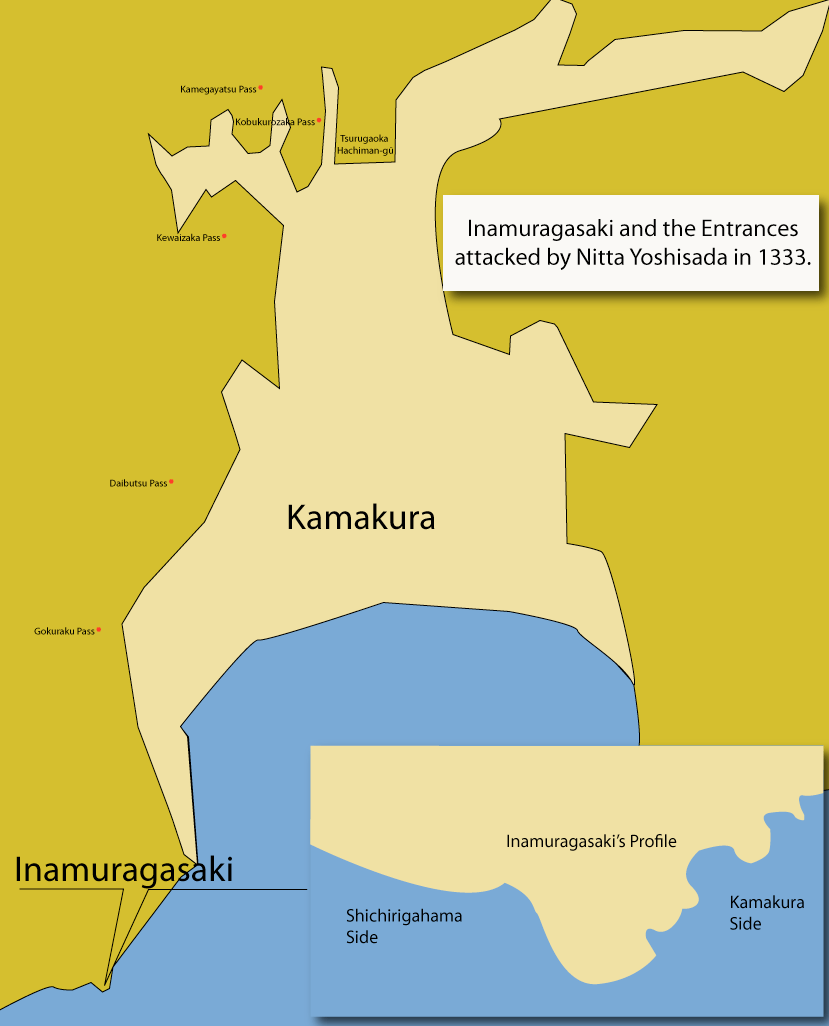
The relative position of Inamuragasaki and of the Passes attacked by Nitta Yoshisada

Because the ancient Tōkaidō highway passed along the sea south of this cape before heading to the Miura Peninsula, before the opening of the Gokuraku Pass Inamuragasaki was the traditional point of entry to Kamakura at the time of the Kamakura shogunate. Now crossed by a road (see photo), it used to be impassable by land and was therefore one of the natural defenses that made Kamakura an impregnable fortress.

For this reason, it appears often in the historical record. It is first mentioned in the Genpei Jōsuiki because the Miura clan in 1180 crossed it twice to go rescue Minamoto no Yoritomo at the battle of Ishibashiyama. The troops didn't arrive in time, Yoritomo was defeated and the Miura had to go back the way they had come.

The cape then appears in the Kaidōki (海道記) because its author in 1223 passed it to enter Kamakura. Inamuragasaki is also mentioned in the Azuma Kagami, the Man'yōshū, the Heike Monogatari and the Taiheiki, although the first two call it with its old name, Mikoshinosaki (見超の崎•水超の崎•御輿が崎).

Finally, Nitta Yoshisada made it immortal in Japanese culture bypassing it on the evening of July 3, 1333. to invade Kamakura, bringing the Kamakura shogunate to an end. For this reason, it has been nominated a Historic Site by the Japanese government.

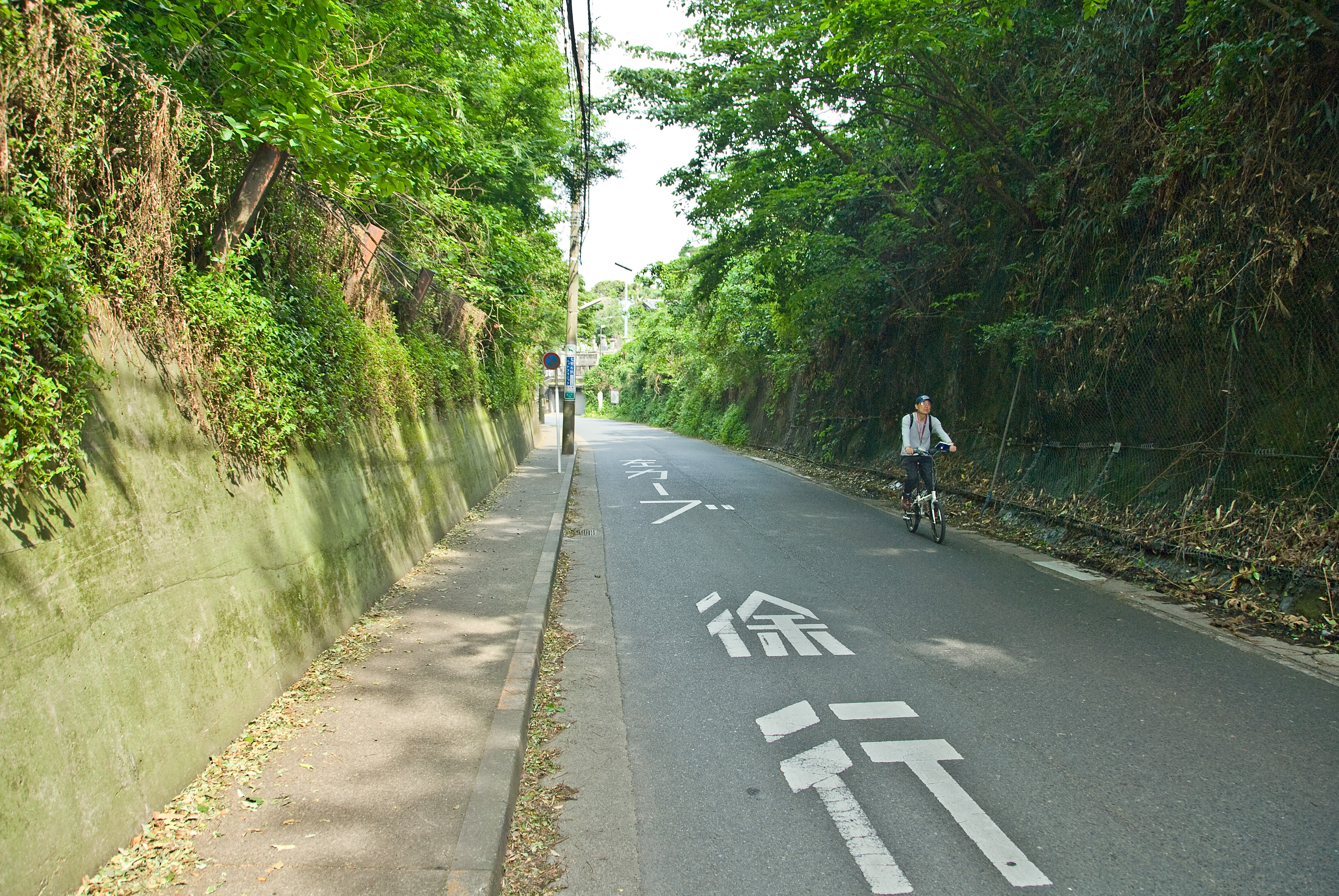
The Gokuraku Pass, where Nitta Yoshisada's army was defeated

Nitta's forces came down Kamakura Kaidō's northern course (the Kami no Michi (上道)), fighting the Hōjō along the way Arrived in Kamakura, they first tried to enter through the Gokuraku, Kobukorozaka and Kewaizaka Passes, but concentrated Hōjō forces managed to stop them. Judging it impossible to enter by land, Nitta decided to try bypassing Inamuragasaki.

=== The Taiheiki version of the events ===
According to the Taiheiki, on the night before the attack Nitta watched from the top of a hill the enemy camp and its defenses closing the Gokuraku Pass, then the beach, blocked by heavy fortifications. He knew that the sea was guarded by hundreds of enemy ships. Looking at nearby Inamuragasaki, he threw his sword into the surf, prayed to Ryūjin and asked for its help. The sea retreated by twenty chō (a mile), taking the Hōjō navy away and leaving ample space for his forces to penetrate. The stele at Sode no Ura (袖の浦), the tiny bay west of Inamuragaki, says:

666 years ago on May 21, 1333 Nitta Yoshisada, judging an invasion on land to be difficult, decided to try to bypass this cape. This is the place where, according to tradition, he threw his golden sword into the waves, praying the sea-god to withdraw them and let him pass.
(Stele erected in 1917)

In 1993, however, Japanese historian Susumu Ishii, after examining and comparing historical records and the results of recent surveys, declared that the date given by the Taiheiki must be wrong, and that the likely day of entry of Nitta's army must have been June 30, 1333.

=== What historians believe happened ===
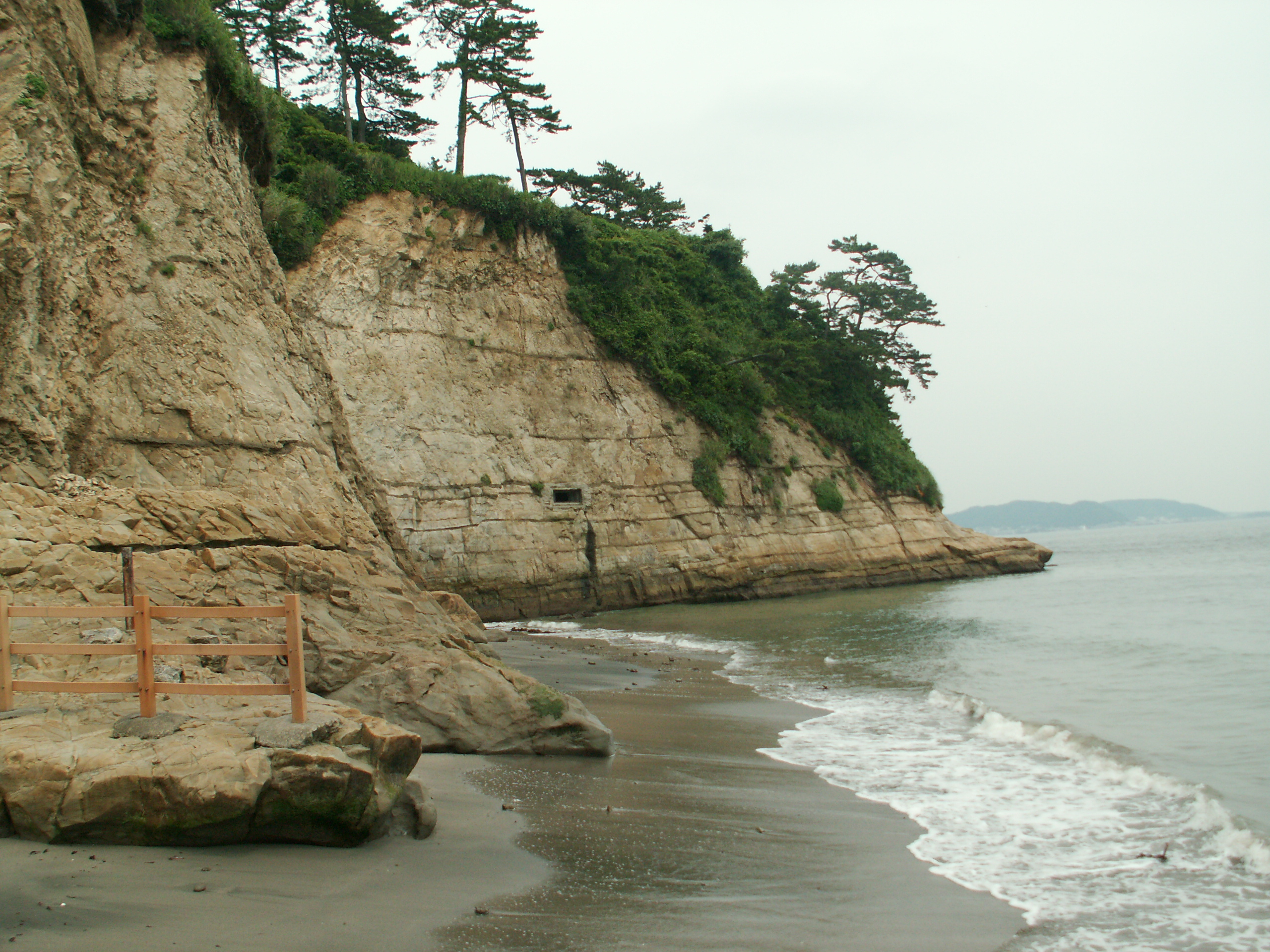
The tip of the cape at low tide seen from Shichirigahama

It is believed that Nitta must have taken advantage of a low tide to enter Kamakura and capture it. Bypassing the cape on foot would be impossible today even at an extraordinarily low tide and its base is always entirely under water but, according to old texts, sea level there was lower a thousand years ago and a narrow strip of land regularly appeared at low tide. The Azuma Kagami states that, on September 21, 1181, shōgun Minamoto no Yoritomo went to Inamuragasaki because of an archery contest that was going to take place on its beach.

Recent scientific surveys in situ, taken into account present tide levels and estimated tide levels in 1333, confirm that Nitta's army could have entered Kamakura through Inamuragasaki exploiting a low tide. Since Nitta had spent a long time in Kamakura as a vassal of the Hōjō, he could have been familiar enough with its tides to be conceivably able to take advantage of them.
