= Smolnitsa, Estonia =

Village in Estonia

Smolnitsa
- Village
- Location in Estonia
- Coordinates: 59°00′37″N 27°35′57″E
- Country: Estonia
- County: Ida-Viru County
- Municipality: Alutaguse Parish

Population (2000)
  - Total: 19

Smolnitsa is a village in Alutaguse Parish, Ida-Viru County, in northeastern Estonia. It is located on the northern shore of Lake Peipus. Smolnitsa has a population of 19 (as of 2000).

== See also ==
- Smolnitsa Landscape Conservation Area
