= Ulaskova Chapel =

Chapel in Setomaa, Estonia

- Ulaskova tsässon
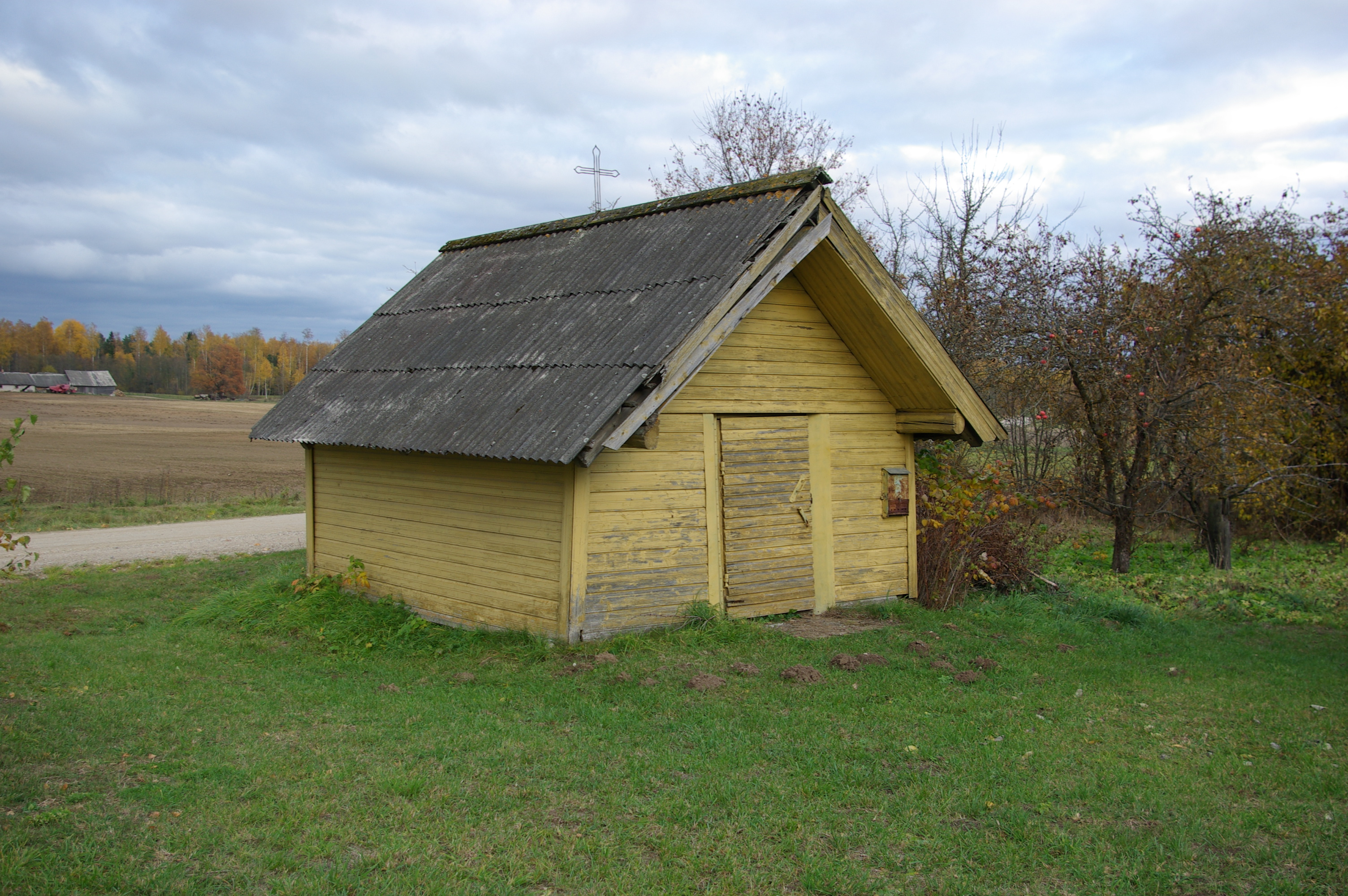

Religion
- Affiliation: Estonian Apostolic Orthodox Church

Location
- Location: Ulaskova, Setomaa Parish, Estonia
- Interactive map of Ulaskova Chapel
- Coordinates: 57°45′14.15″N 27°25′12.5″E

Architecture
- Materials: wood

Ulaskova Chapel (Estonian: Ulaskova tsässon) is a small Seto chapel in the village of Ulaskova, Setomaa Parish, Võru County, Estonia.

== General information ==
The building is not state protected. It is in good condition.

== Building data ==
Ulaskova Chapel is a one-story pine cross-beam building with a square floor plan and a gable roof. The outer measurements are 466 x 372 cm, and the building has one interior room (13.9 m^{2}). The exterior of the building has changed significantly: it used to have an entrance room and the walls were not covered by boards. The building has a doorway measuring 84 x 155 cm, with a single-sided leaf made from boards fixed on the crosspiece by forged hinges. The door opens outward. The building has one wooden-framed window with five panes, measuring 45 x 65 cm and painted yellowish-white. The opening for the window is outlined by profiled boards from the inside.
