= Vahur Kersna =

Estonian journalist and radio/television personality

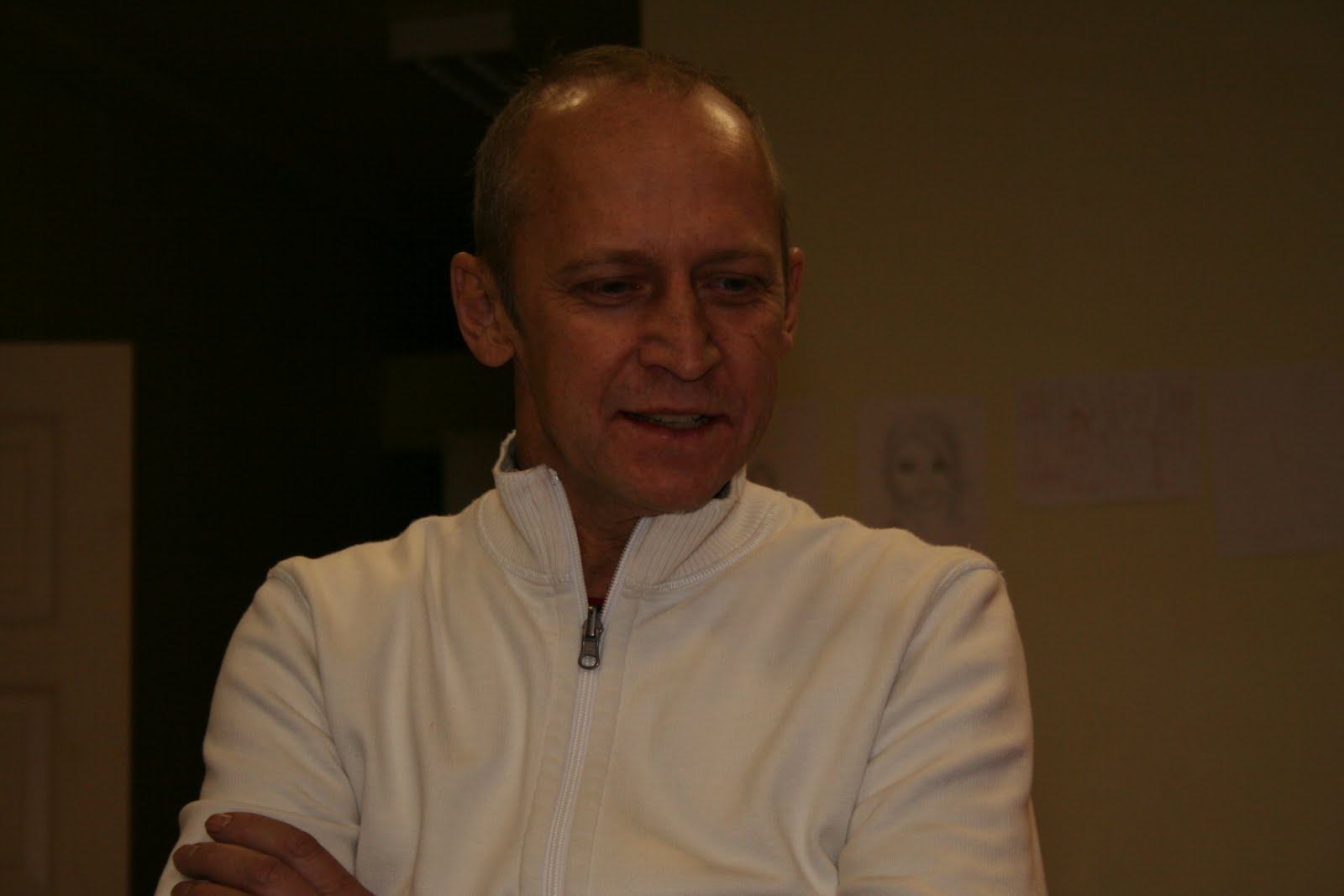
Vahur Kersna

Vahur Kersna (also Vahur-Üllar Kersna; born on 4 April 1962) is an Estonian journalist, radio and television personality and caricaturist.

In 1985, he graduated from Tartu State University in journalism.

From 1986 to 2007, he was the host for many morning programs on Vikerraadio.

He has led several popular television programs, e.g. Pealtnägija

== Awards ==
- 2004 Kuldmikrofon ('Golden Microphone')
- 2020 Order of the White Star, IV Class.
