= Hannes Vanaküla =

Estonian esotericist

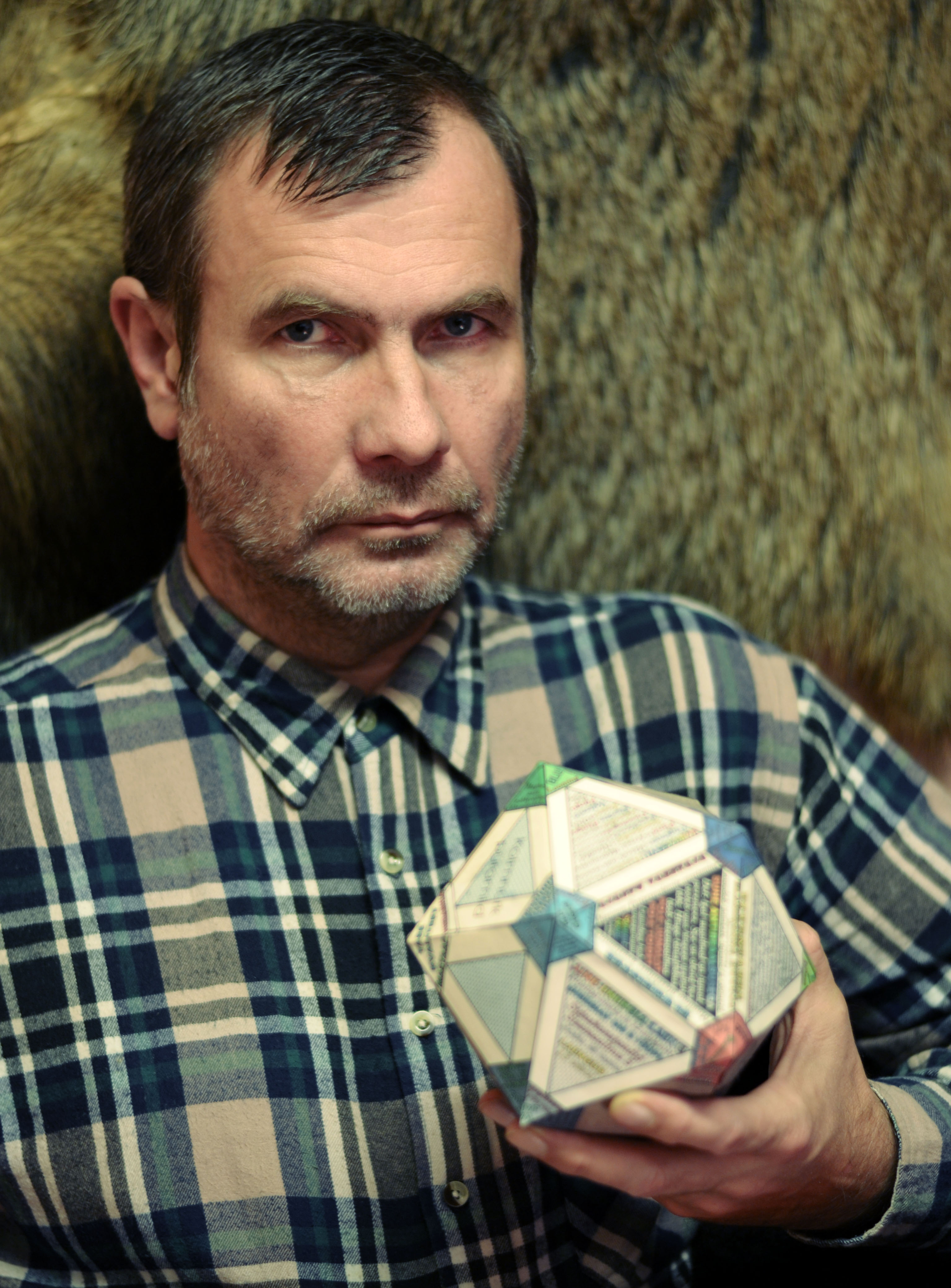
- Hannes Vanaküla in 2015
- Born: 23 November 1966 (age 59); Tallinn, Estonia
- Other names: Tokroda
- Occupation: mage
- Known for: esoteric claims

Hannes Vanaküla, also known as Tokroda (born 23 November 1966, in Tallinn), is an Estonian mage. In media he has been called a charlatan and a cult leader.

== Activities ==
In 2004, Vanaküla claimed to have transported "energy pillars", supposedly mystical structures helpful of magical work, from throughout the world to Estonia, supposedly their original and rightful positions. These claims, as well as the controversy over reality and transportability of those energy pillars between Vanaküla and Vormsi Enn, another esoteric practitioner, were reported in various media. Reportedly, the procedure involved Vanaküla and 21 followers entering trance for "several days" and "identifying with energy pillars throughout the world". The original locations were reported as Egypt, Tibet, United States and Lapland.

In 2008, Vanaküla and two of his followers participated in Selgeltnägijate tuleproov (Estonian: Ordeal for seers), a TV show formulated as a contest between magic practitioners and based on the format of America's Psychic Challenge. His followers were noted for applying unusual items, such as mace and bucket, for divination.

Shortly after the TV show series began, Vanaküla and his two followers from the show agreed to take on the skeptik.ee 10 000 EEK challenge in a test of their telepathical powers. The agreed-on protocol involved a "transmitter" being shown various household items randomly drawn from a duffel bag whose content had not been revealed to participants before the experiment, and asking the "recipients" – the rôle of Vanaküla and his followers – to guess the items. The results were to be considered positive if any of the three participants would have guessed correctly at least three items out of six "transmissions".

The experiment's results were considered negative, as all three participants guessed correctly zero items out of six "transmissions".

== Media exposure ==
On 28 January 2009, ETV's Pealtnägija (English: Witness, an Estonian popular documentary series similar to Canada's Witness) ran a segment reporting on activities of Vanaküla and his followers, sometimes referred to as tokronauts, spurring media interest in Vanaküla and his followers. Reportedly, most of the followers consider themselves gods and Vanaküla a god of light, Vanaküla himself explaining in the interview to Pealtnägija that he believes that every creative human being is a god. According to cited and interviewed sources, Vanaküla's followers are encouraged to think of outsiders as "people of lower quality" and to withdraw from them; on the other hand, Vanaküla himself is considered a "person of the highest quality", which gives him the power to "repair" women through sex.

Reportedly, the tokronauts have repeatedly attempted to kill various people through "spiritual means". A particular target of such an assassination attempt – admitted by Vanaküla in the interview by Pealtnägija but dismissed as a simple experiment by a single follower – was Condoleezza Rice. When a journalist of delfi.ee asked Harrys Puusepp, the spokesman of Estonia's Northern Police District whether such an admission can lead to criminal investigation into attempted murder or conspiracy to commit murder, Puusepp responded by asking if the journalist was sober, then stated that such an investigation would be contrary to sanity.

The resulting media exposure led to Vanaküla's firing from his long-term position as a leather dyer.

Vanaküla has ascribed Pealtnägija's interest in the affair to a conspiracy involving Christians, Freemasons, and the Estonian party of Union of Pro Patria and Res Publica.

== Political discussions ==
On 18 February 2009, nine members of Riigikogu from the opposition party Keskerakond made a formal inquiry to Estonian Minister of Internal Affairs Jüri Pihl regarding the activities of Vanaküla's sect, asking whether this sect – which they characterised as an 'extremist group' – and others like it are being investigated by the Estonian police and how such activities are regulated under Estonian law.

== Bibliography ==
In 2007, Vanaküla self-published a book Maagia alustalad. Kakskümmend ülekandeliini (ISBN 9789949152223). His publicity stunts, such as advertising his book, caused some media interest.

The book has been translated to English as The Basics of Magic. The Twenty Energy Transfer Channels (ISBN 9780979462436), printed by Noria Books. Although Noria Books has undertaken the printing, the book is a self-publication, fully paid for by Vanaküla himself.
