= Ulaskova =

Village in Estonia

Ulaskova Ulaskova Vlaskova
- Village
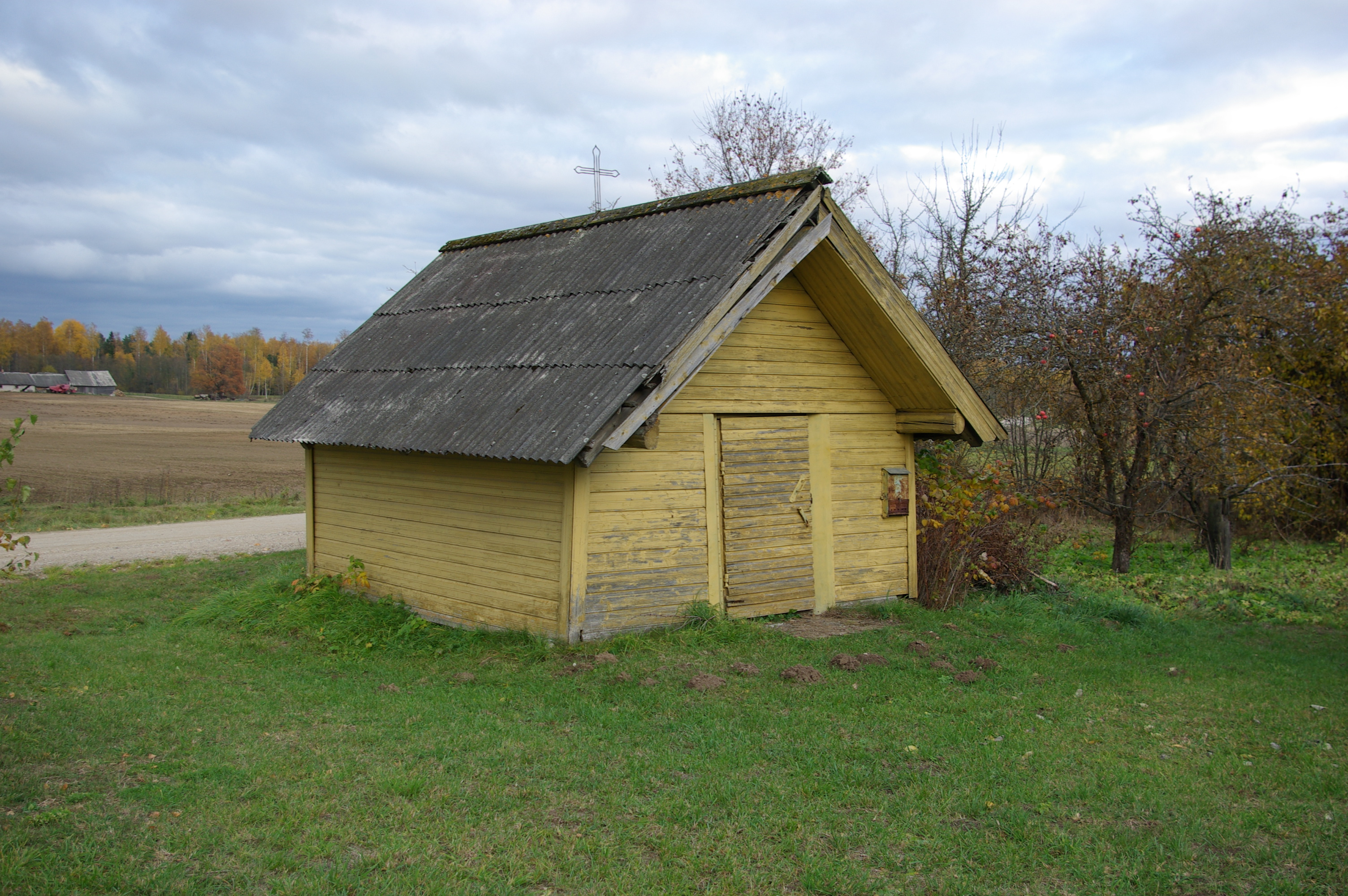
- Ulaskova Chapel in 2013

- Location within Estonia
- Coordinates: 57.753888888889°N 27.421388888889°E
- Country: Estonia
- County: Võru County
- Parish: Setomaa Parish
- First mention: 1585

Area
  - Land: 2.8 km^{2} (1.1 sq mi)

Population (2020)
  - Total: 24
- Time zone: UTC+2 (EET)
  - Summer (DST): UTC+3 (EEST)
- Postal code: 65348

Ulaskova (also known as Ulaskuva, Uusküla, Uussalu) is a village in Setomaa Parish, Võru County in Estonia.

== History ==
Written sources from 1585 first mention the city with a previous name, Vlazova. In 1790, it was mentioned as Vlaskova shmyakina; in 1866 as Vlaskova; and in 1882 as Ulaskova, its modern name. On topographical military maps of Russian Empire, which included Livonia (now Estonia), the village is listed as Vlaskova.

The eastern and northeastern part of Ulaskova was previously jurisdiction of the former village, Väjko-Ulaskova.

Prior to independence, Ulaskova belonged to the Koolina nulk in the Setomaa region.

Before the 2017 Administrative reform in Estonia, the village belonged to Meremäe Parish.

== Etymology ==
The modern name, Ulaskova, comes from the name of Saint Blaise (Vlas) of Sebaste, the patron saint of domestic animals. According to the remark of the Estonian linguist Lembit Vaba, in the toponyms of Setu, which are mostly of Slavic origin, are evident due to the characteristics of Belarusian phonetics, such as the beginning of the name: vl- —› st- (Vlaskova —› Ulaskovo). In Pskov Oblast there is a village Ulaskovo and several villages Vlaskovo; in the north of Russia there is a river Vlaskova.

== Geography ==
Ulaskova is located 25 km southeast of the county center, Võru, and 24 km southwest of the parish center, Värska. It is 144 meters above sea level.

== Attractions ==
There is a chapel (in the local dialect tsässon) in the village, Ulaskova Chapel. It is dedicated to the Martyr Demetrius of Thessaloniki. It is a 1 story house made of pine logs with a transverse log and double pitched roof. It is 4.66 x 3.72 m in size and contains 1 inner room with an area of 13.9 m^{2}. The appearance of the chapel has been significantly changed since its creation, as it had previously possessed a canopy.The chapel has a doorway measuring 0.84 x 1.55 m; the wooden door has forged hangers and opens outwards; one wooden window measuring 45 x 65 cm is divided into five squares, painted yellow.

== Demographics ==
According to the 2011 census, 18 people lived in the village of Ulaskova, all ethnic Estonians.

Population of Ulaskova village:

Year	1959	1970	2000	2011	2017	2018	2019	2020
Population	48	26	33	18	21	23	22	24
