= Koshigoe =

Coordinates: 35°18′30.6″N 139°29′35″E

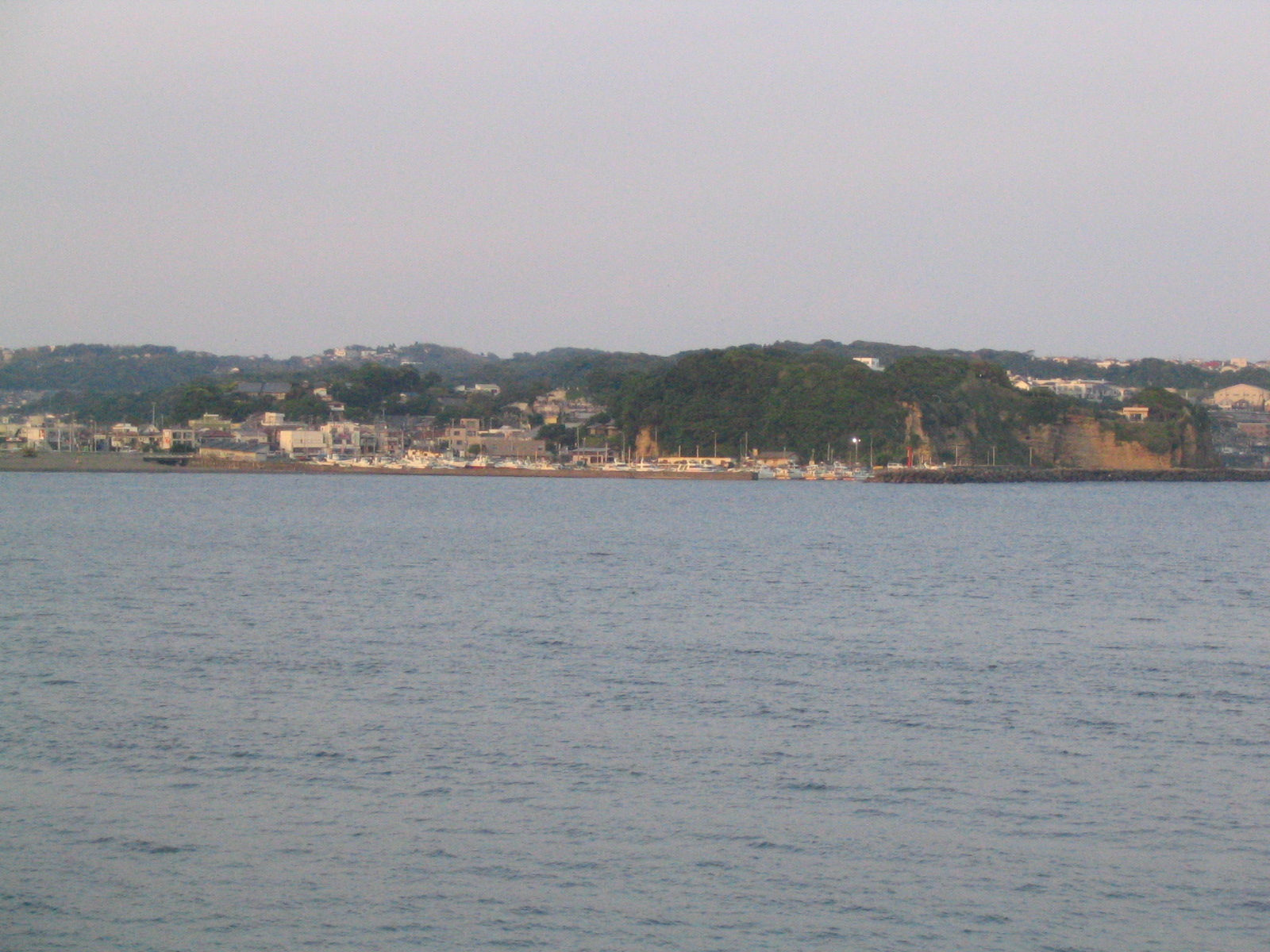
A view of Koshigoe

Koshigoe (腰越) is a part of the municipality of Kamakura, Kanagawa prefecture, Japan, located at the western end of the beach of Shichirigahama, near Fujisawa. The name seems to stem from the fact it was founded by people who crossed ("goe") the base ("koshi") of the mountains to reach the fertile plains near the sea.

This small town's name has gone down to history for its deep links with beloved hero Minamoto no Yoshitsune who, having defeated the Taira clan in 1185 after the Genpei War, arrived in Koshigoe with Taira no Munemori and his son Taira no Kiyomune as his prisoners in tow. He meant to bring them personally to Kamakura, but was forbidden to enter by his brother Yoritomo. His prisoners were, however, taken away and paraded on Wakamiya Ōji, Kamakura's main street. Yoshitsune waited fruitlessly for the permission to enter for about 20 days at Koshigoe's Manpuku-ji, near Shichirigahama, then dictated to his attendant Benkei a letter for Yoritomo destined to become famous, the "Letter from Koshigoe". He later gave up and left, but his brother pursued him and his severed head, pickled in sake, was exposed to the public's view, again in Koshigoe, four years later. In 1335, Hōjō Tokiyuki was defeated here by Ashikaga Takauji and his army.
