= Smolnitsa Landscape Conservation Area =

Protected area in Estonia

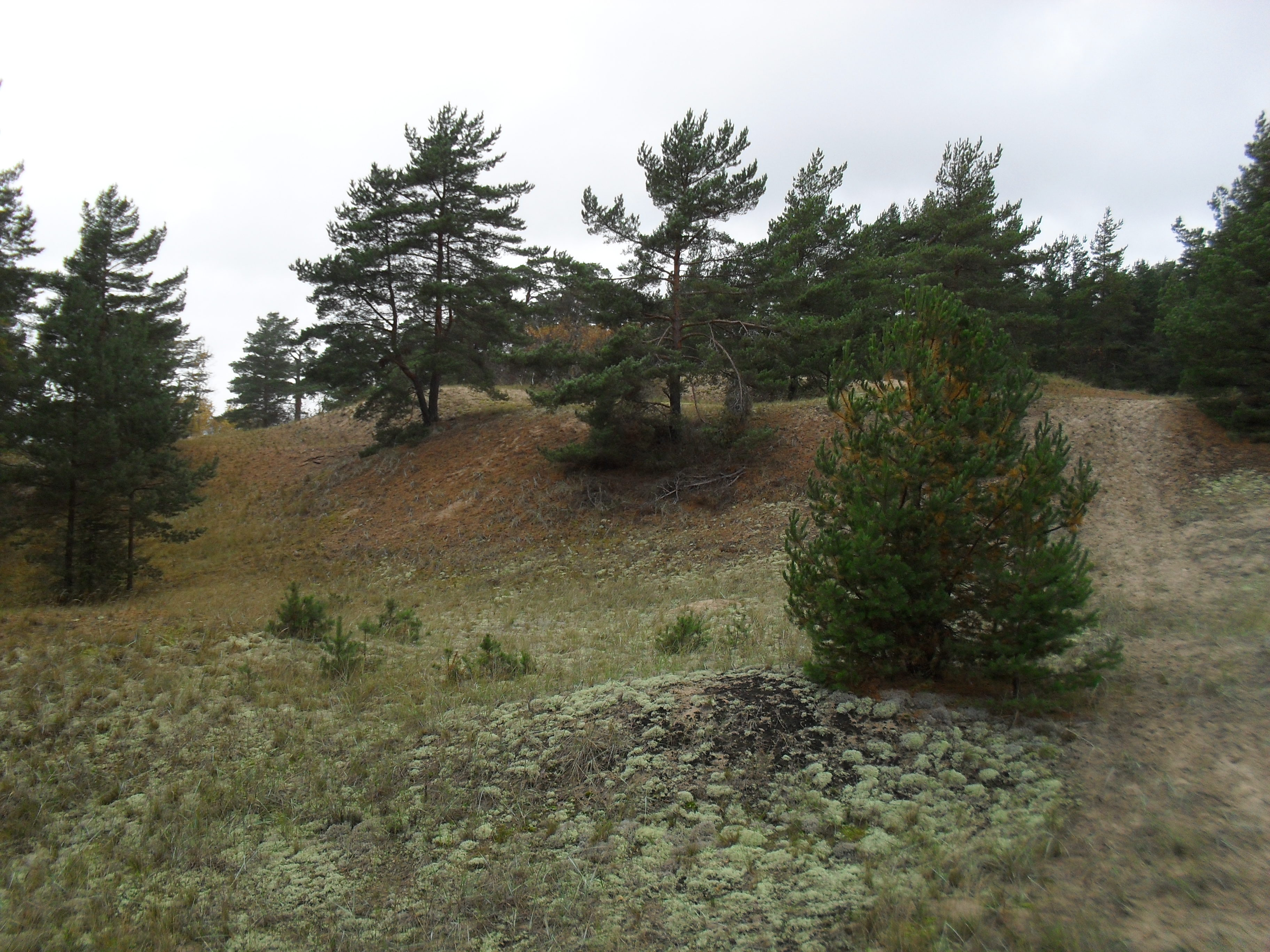

- Location within Estonia
- Location: Estonia
- Coordinates: 59°00′20″N 27°40′00″E
- Area: 242 ha (600 acres)
- Established: 1967

Smolnitsa Landscape Conservation Area was a nature park which was located in Ida-Viru County, Estonia.

== Size ==
The area of the nature park was 242 ha.

== History ==
The protected area was founded in 1967 to protect the dunes of Peipus Lake's northern coast (Estonian: Peipsi põhjaranniku luitestik) and its biodiversity.

In 2021, the protected area was incorporated to Alutaguse National Park.
