= Remniku =

Village in Estonia

- Village
- Location in Estonia
- Coordinates: 59°00′41″N 27°32′46″E
- Country: Estonia
- County: Ida-Viru County
- Municipality: Alutaguse Parish

Population (2000)
  - Total: 59

Remniku is a village in Alutaguse Parish, Ida-Viru County, in northeastern Estonia. It is located on the northern shore of Lake Peipus. Remniku had a population of 59 in 2000.

In 1990–1994, a border guard training centre was situated in Remniku.
