= Uusküla, Ida-Viru County =

Village in Estonia

Uusküla
- Village
- Location in Estonia
- Coordinates: 59°00′12″N 27°20′01″E
- Country: Estonia
- County: Ida-Viru County
- Municipality: Alutaguse Parish

Population (2000)
  - Total: 69

Uusküla is a village in Alutaguse Parish, Ida-Viru County, in northeastern Estonia. It is located on the northern shore of Lake Peipus. Uusküla has a population of 69 (as of 2000).

== Name ==
Uusküla was attested in historical sources as Ново-Деревня in 1894 and Nowaja Derewnja in 1913. The name literally means 'new village', and Uusküla was settled by families previously considered to belong to neighboring Kuru. In 1782, Kuru consisted of two parts, attested as Gros Kurro and Klein Kurro (literally, 'big Kuru' and 'little Kuru'), and it is believed that Uusküla developed from the latter settlement.
