= Alajõe, Ida-Viru County =

Village in Estonia

Alajõe
- Village
- Location in Estonia
- Coordinates: 59°00′38″N 27°25′32″E
- Country: Estonia
- County: Ida-Viru County
- Municipality: Alutaguse Parish
- First mentioned: 1583

Population (2000)
  - Total: 147

Alajõe (Russian: Олешница, Oleshnitsa) is a village in Ida-Viru County, in northeastern Estonia. It is located on the northern shore of Lake Peipus. Alajõe is the administrative centre of Alutaguse Parish. In 2000 the village had a population of 147.

Alajõe was first mentioned in 1583.

== Gallery ==
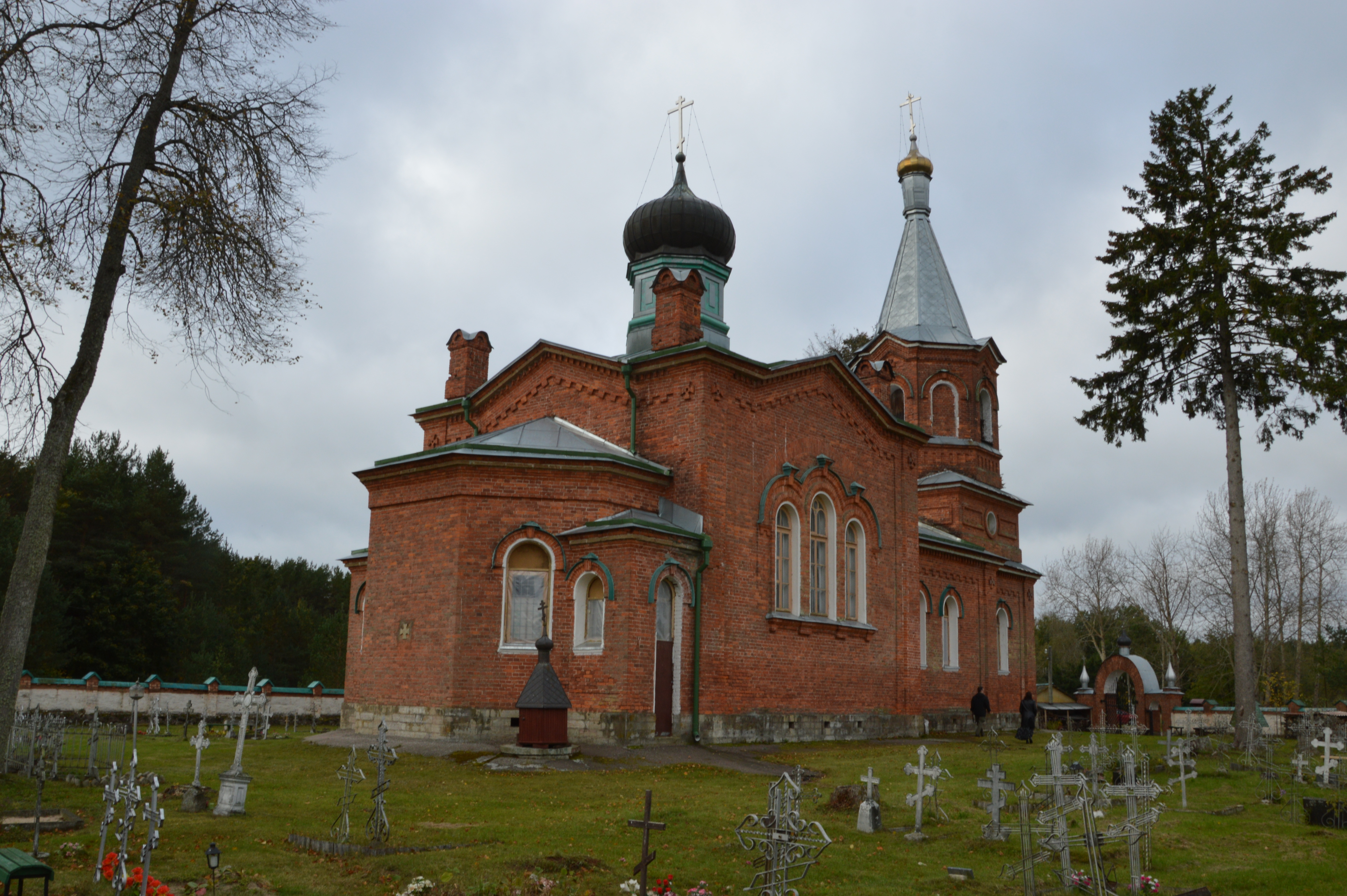
Alajõe Orthodox Church

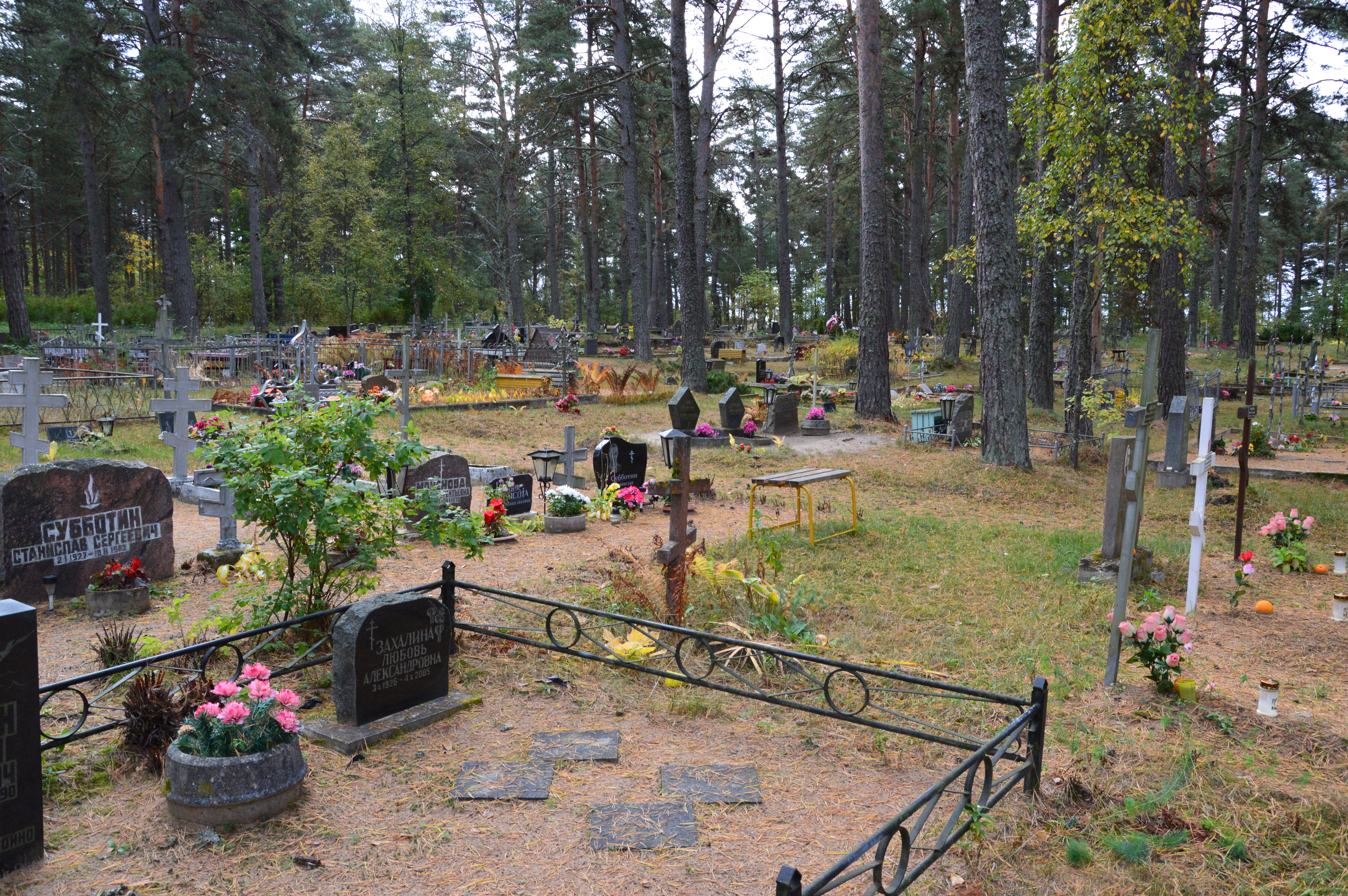
Alajõe cemetery

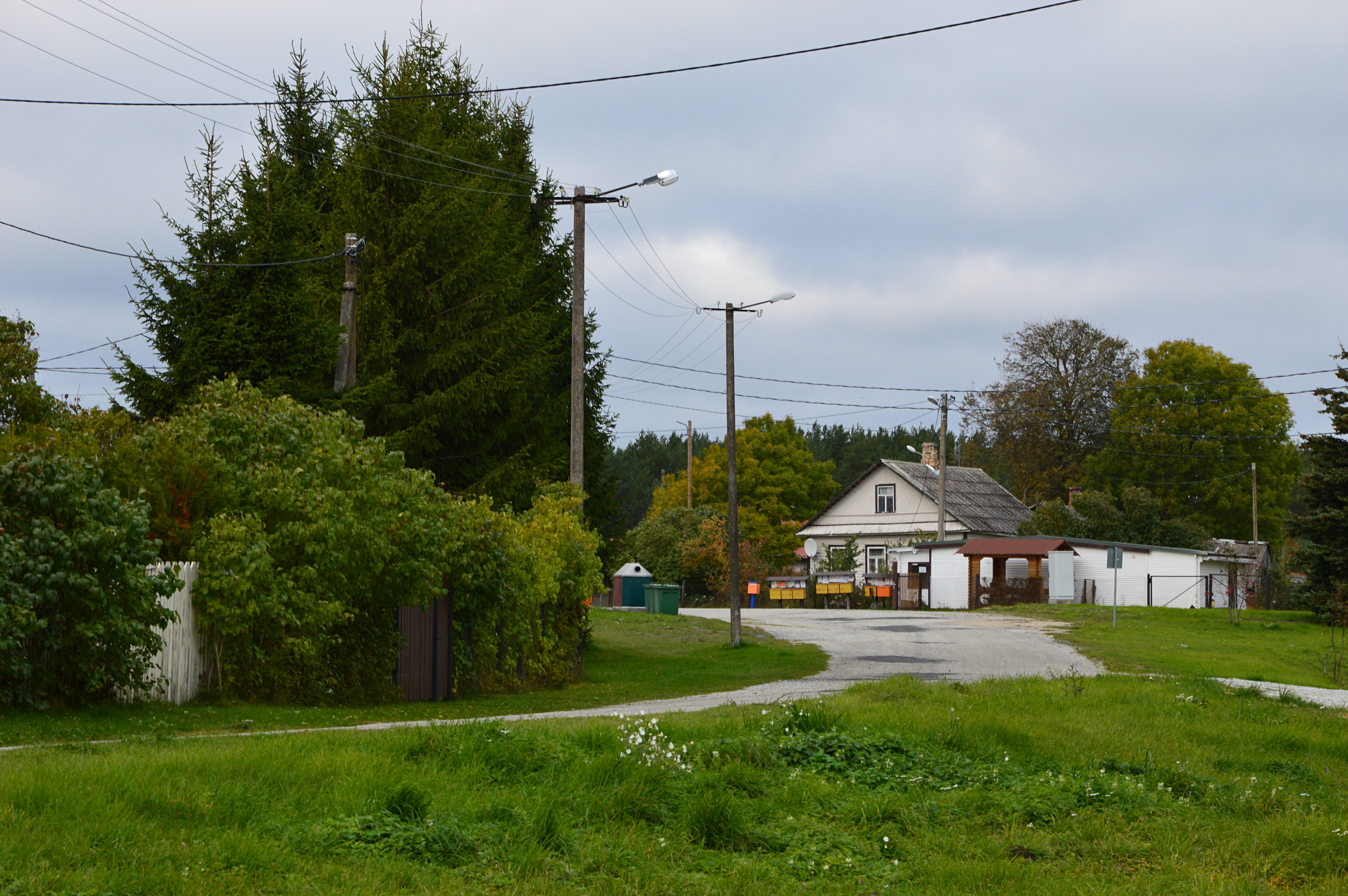
Village

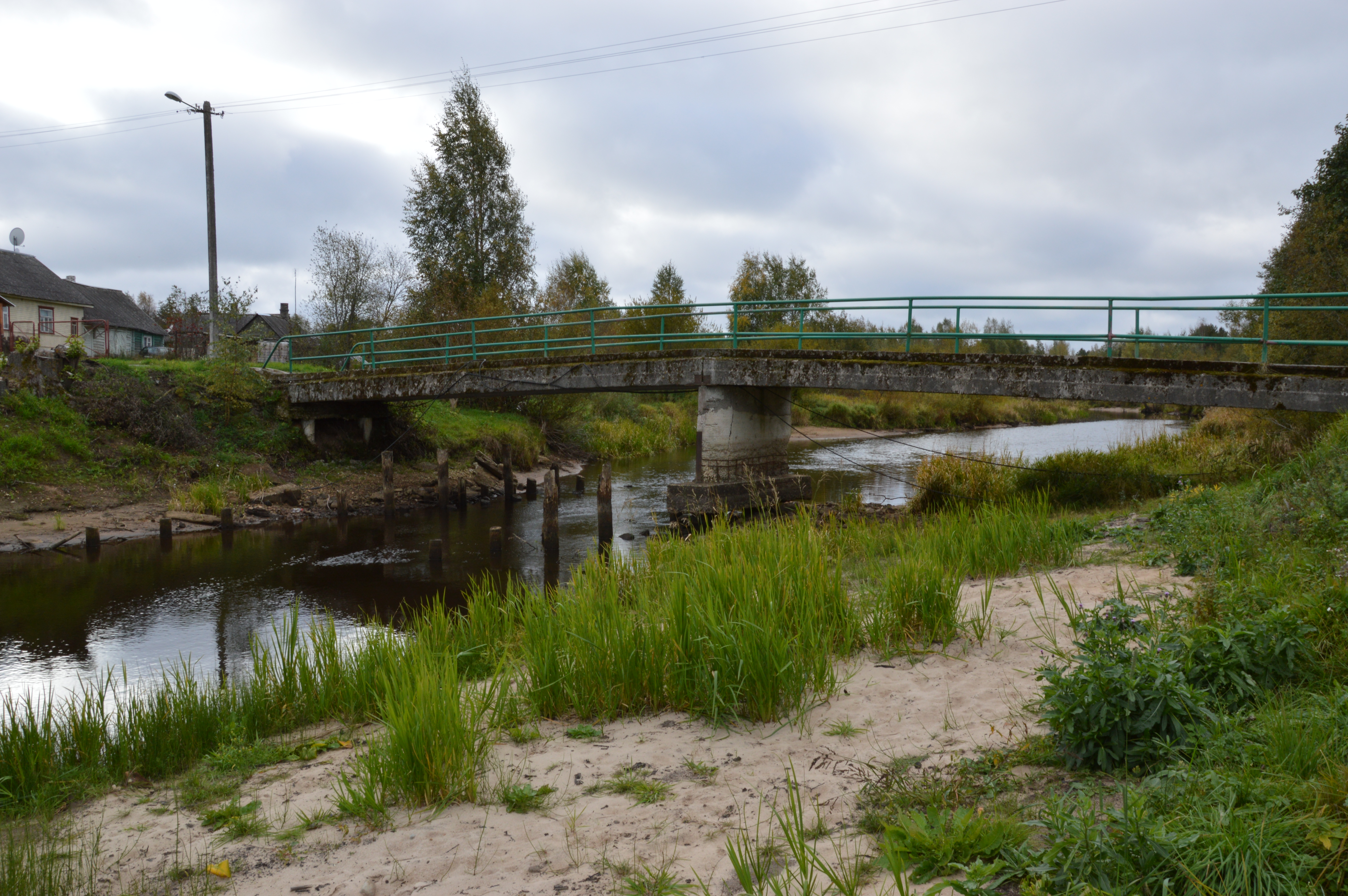
Alajõgi River
