= Katase =

Village in Estonia

- Village
- Location in Estonia
- Coordinates: 59°00′21″N 27°22′28″E
- Country: Estonia
- County: Ida-Viru County
- Municipality: Alutaguse Parish
- First mentioned: 1419

Population (2011)
  - Total: 49

Katase is a village in Alutaguse Parish, Ida-Viru County, in northeastern Estonia. It is located on the northern shore of Lake Peipus. Katase has a population of 49 (as of 2011).

Katase was first mentioned in 1419.
