= Karjamaa, Ida-Viru County =

Village in Estonia

Karjamaa
- Village
- Location in Estonia
- Coordinates: 59°00′41″N 27°28′47″E
- Country: Estonia
- County: Ida-Viru County
- Municipality: Alutaguse Parish

Population (2000)
  - Total: 30

Karjamaa is a village in Alutaguse Parish, Ida-Viru County, in northeastern Estonia. It is located on the northern shore of Lake Peipus. Karjamaa has a population of 30 (as of 2000).
