= Pealtnägija =

Estonian television series

Pealtnägija ('Eyewitness') is an Estonian investigative journalism television program. The program was launched on 29 September 1999 in ETV, being therefore the oldest running investigative television program in Estonia.

Television statistics shows that about 20% of Estonia's population watches this television program.

Notable interviewees include Paolo Coelho, Phil Collins, Jakob von Uexküll and George Soros.
