= Iisaku Parish =

Former municipality of Estonia

Coordinates: 59°06′05″N 27°18′29″E

Iisaku Parish Iisaku vald
- Former municipality of Estonia
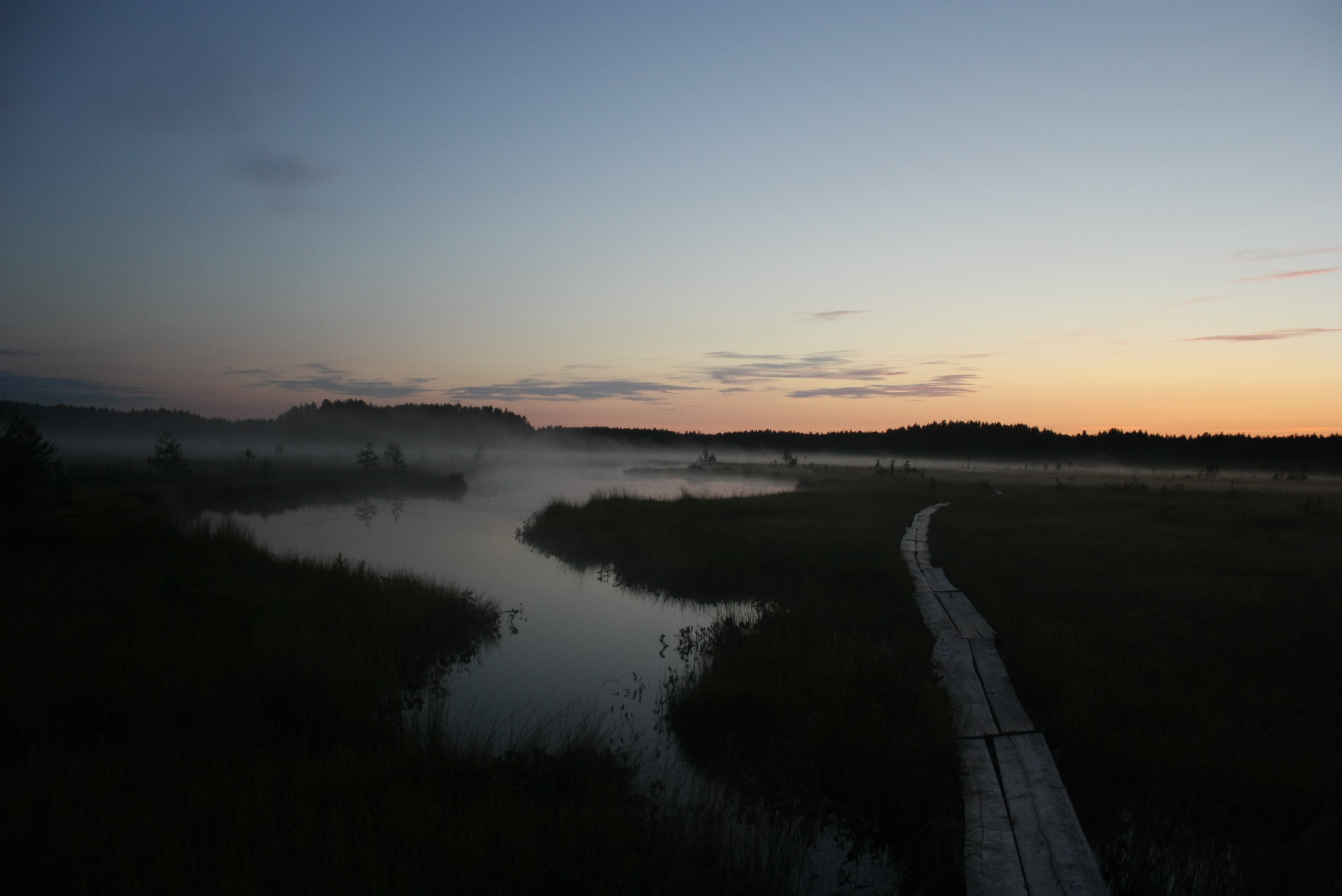
- Muraka bog

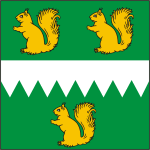
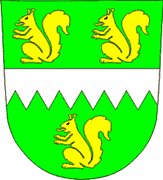
- Flag Coat of arms

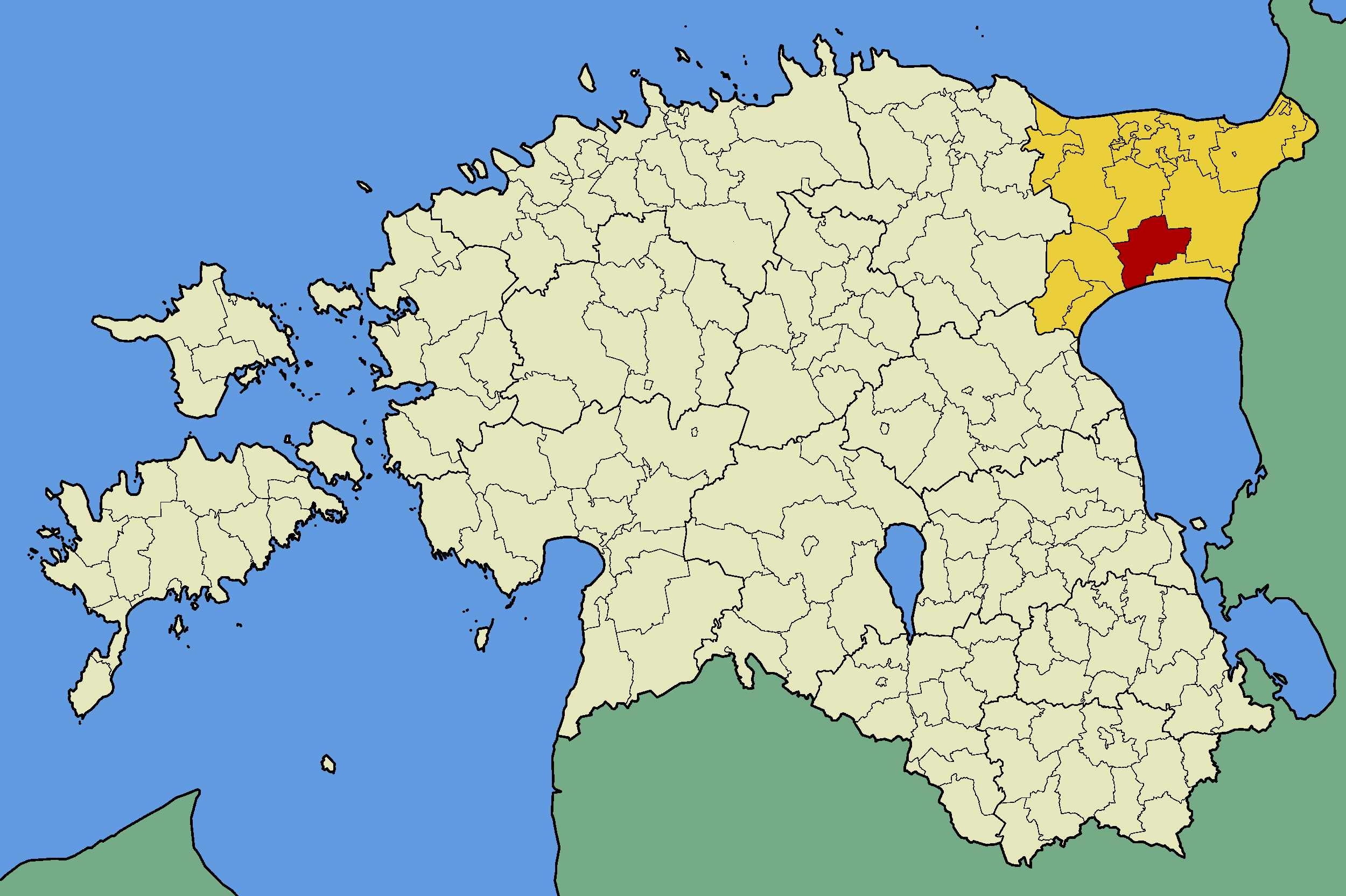
- Iisaku Parish within Ida-Viru County.
- Country: Estonia
- County: Ida-Viru County
- Administrative centre: Iisaku

Area
  - Total: 258 km^{2} (100 sq mi)

Population
  - Total: 1,425
  - Density: 5.52/km^{2} (14.3/sq mi)
- Website: www.iisakuvv.ee

Iisaku Parish was a rural municipality of Ida-Viru County in northern Estonia. It had a population of 1425 and an area of 258 km².

== Settlements ==
Small borough

Iisaku

Villages

Alliku - Imatu - Jõuga - Kasevälja - Kauksi - Koldamäe - Kuru - Lipniku - Lõpe - Pootsiku - Sõrumäe - Sälliku - Taga-Roostoja - Tammetaguse - Tärivere - Vaikla - Varesmetsa
