= Tudulinna Parish =

Former municipality of Estonia

Coordinates: 59°2′N 27°5′E

Tudulinna Parish Tudulinna vald
- Former municipality of Estonia
- Tudulinna church

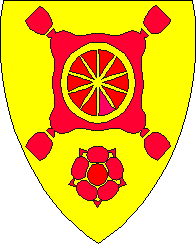
- Flag Coat of arms

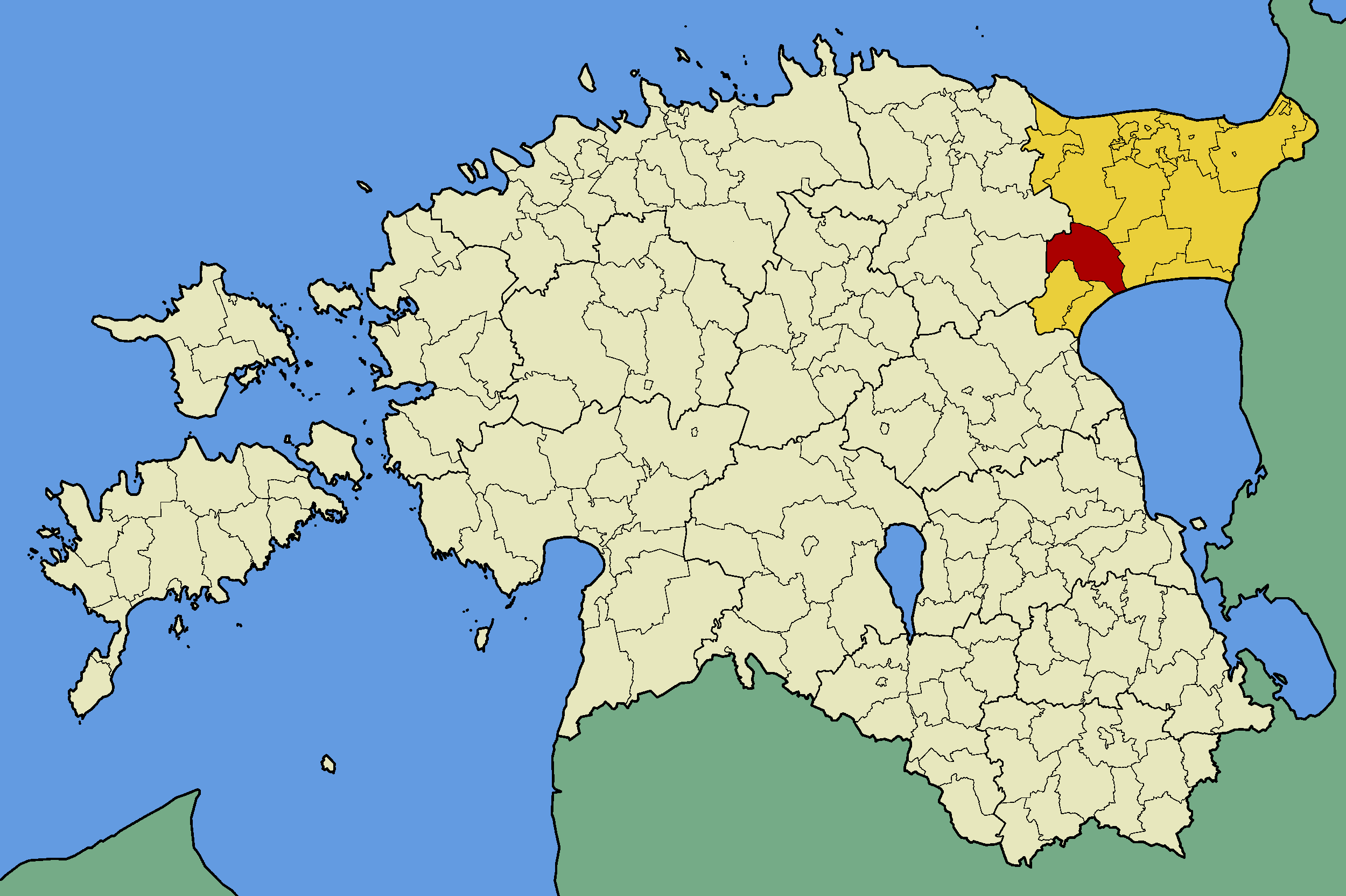
- Tudulinna Parish within Ida-Viru County.
- Country: Estonia
- County: Ida-Viru County
- Administrative centre: Tudulinna

Area
  - Total: 270 km^{2} (100 sq mi)

Population (2006)
  - Total: 629
  - Density: 2.3/km^{2} (6.0/sq mi)
- Website: www.tudulinnavv.ee

Tudulinna Parish (Estonian: Tudulinna vald) was an Estonian municipality located in Ida-Viru County. It had a population of 629 (2006) and an area of 270 km^{2}.

== Populated places ==
Small borough

Tudulinna

Villages

Kellassaare, Lemmaku, Oonurme, Peressaare, Pikati, Rannapungerja, Roostoja, Sahargu, Tagajõe.
