= Mäetaguse (disambiguation) =

Mäetaguse may refer to several places in Estonia:

- Mäetaguse, small borough in Alutaguse Parish, Ida-Viru County
  - Mäetaguse Parish, former municipality in Ida-Viru County
- Mäetaguse, Ida-Viru County (village), village in Alutaguse Parish, Ida-Viru County
- Mäetaguse, Lääne-Viru County, village in Vinni Parish, Lääne-Viru County
