= Ratva =

Village in Estonia

Coordinates: 59°16′N 27°13′E

- Village
- Interactive map of Ratva
- Country: Estonia
- County: Ida-Viru County
- Parish: Alutaguse Parish
- Time zone: UTC+2 (EET)
  - Summer (DST): UTC+3 (EEST)

Ratva is a village in Alutaguse Parish, Ida-Viru County in northeastern Estonia. Prior to the 2017 administrative reform of local governments, it was located in Mäetaguse Parish.

== See also ==
- Lake Ratva
