= Meeli Kõiva =

Estonian artist

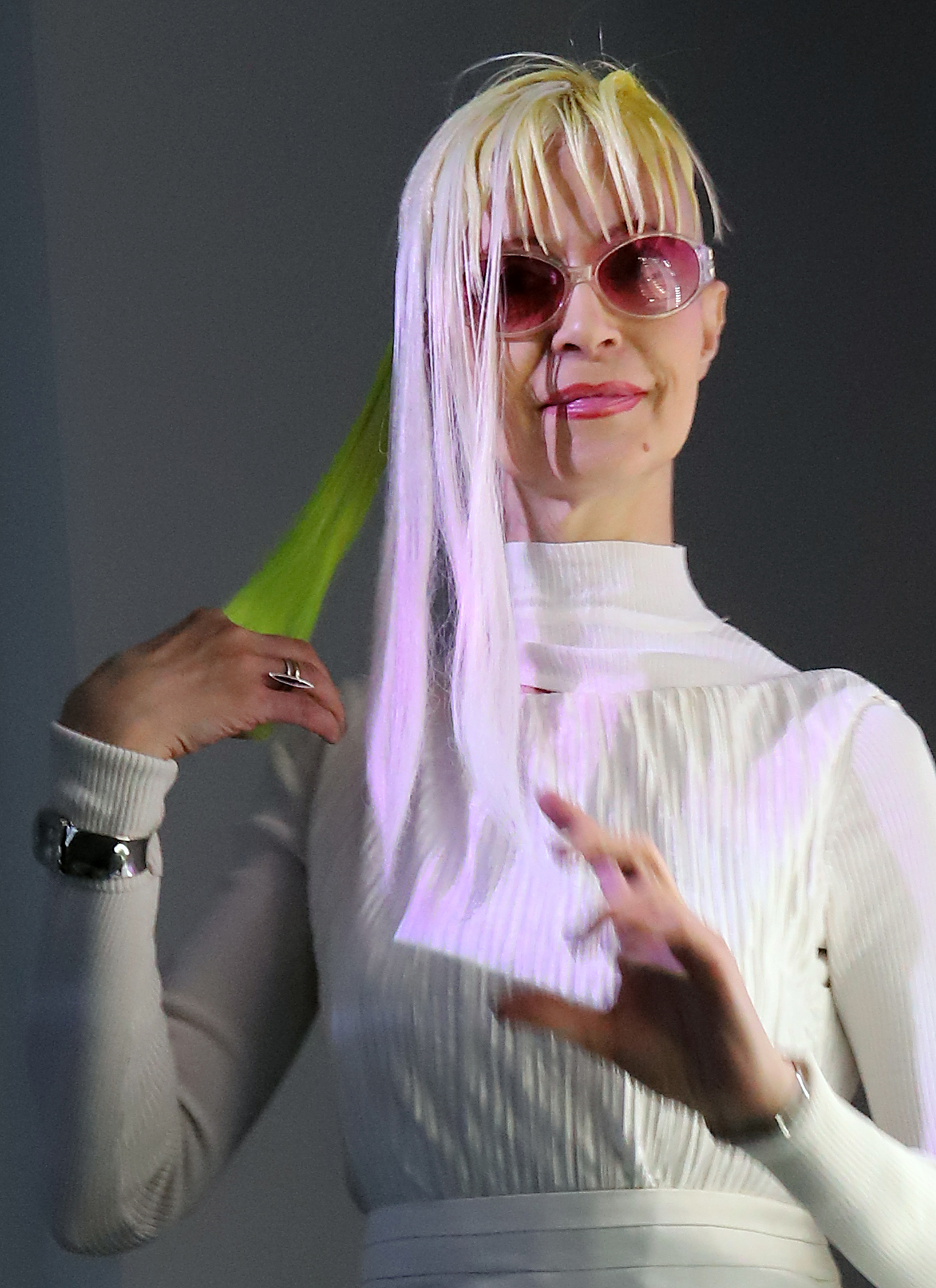
Meeli Kõiva

Meeli Kõiva (known professionally as Mery Crystal Ra; born 14 January 1960, Tartu, Estonia) is an Estonian-American artist, curator, and art filmmaker who primarily works with architectural glass, light and multimedia. She is active in Finland, Belgium, and the United States, where she has produced a range of paintings, architectural lighting sculptures, multimedia installations, videos, and architectural stained glass. She pioneered a new era of architectural light-art space by bringing in the participation of light observers, focusing on "light motion via glass surfaces and esoteric meanings: limits of the mind and body"

== Career ==
Kõiva studied painting and worked with glass, plastics, and lasers at the Estonian Academy of Arts (formerly the Tallinn Art University), graduating in 1984. Her first exhibition was held in 1991 at the Estonian Fairs in Tallinn, Estonia. In 1994, she represented Estonia at the "Jubilee" festival in Malmö, Sweden. She is a member of the Estonian Association of Artists.

Kõiva is interested in using abstract stained glass in architecture, in a non-religious and religious context. Through her work, she integrates architecture and interior design using glass and other reflective surfaces, color and light to create an "intriguing moment" for viewers. More recently, Kõiva has also included video and multimedia components in her work. She is best known for Reactive River, a 2006 exhibition in the European Parliament building in Brussels, Belgium.

In 2013 and 2014, Kõiva was a winner of the Light In the city, Northern Light competition. In 2015, she was awarded the "Public Choice Video Award" by CODAworx. Kõiva was invited to speak at the 2016 closing ceremonies of the United Nations International Year of Light in Mérida, Mexico, where she also installed an exhibition, "Light for Peace."

In addition to her work with glass and light, Kõiva also paints and makes jewelry using leather and glass.

== Selected installations ==
- "Tele-echo," Tallinn TV Tower, Tallinn, Estonia, 1985
- "Scratching Horizon," The Port of Tallinn, Estonia, 1993
- "Wings," Supreme Court of Estonia, Tartu, Estonia, 1996
- "Reactive River," Main Building, European Parliament, Brussels, Belgium, 2006
- "Flying Sheets of Paper," Glaston Corporation, Tampere, Finland, 2012
- "Golden Gate Meets Golden Gateway," TETRA building, Mäetaguse Parish, Mäetaguse, Estonia, 2014
- "Parasite Beach," Estonian Mining Museum, Kohtla-Nõmme, Estonia, 2016
- "Light for Peace," International Year of Light 2015 closing ceremony, Mérida, Mexico, February 4–6, 2016.

== Films ==
- Light for Peace, 2:42 min.
- Parasite Beach, 4:39 min.
- Golden Gate Meets Golden Gateway, 2:54 min.
- Flying Sheets Of Paper, 3:14 min.
- Human Touch /Serendipity Dating At Baldachin Bed
