= Allik =

Estonian family name

Allik is an Estonian surname meaning "water source" or "spring". Notable people with the surname include:

- Hendrik Allik (1901–1989), Estonian communist politician
- Jaak Allik (born 1946), Estonian politician and theatre director
- Johanna Allik (born 1994), Estonian figure skater
- Jüri Allik, (born 1949), Estonian psychologist
- Kristi Allik (born 1952), Canadian music educator and composer
- Peeter Allik (1966–2019), Estonian artist

== See also ==
- Allika (disambiguation)
- Alliku (disambiguation)
