= Jõetaguse =

Jõetaguse may refer to several places in Estonia:

- Jõetaguse, Ida-Viru County, village in Alutaguse Parish, Ida-Viru County
- Jõetaguse, Lääne-Viru County, village in Kadrina Parish, Lääne-Viru County
