= Aruküla (disambiguation) =

Aruküla may refer to several places in Estonia:

- Aruküla, small borough in Raasiku Parish, Harju County
- Aruküla, Hiiu County, village in Hiiumaa Parish, Hiiu County
- Aruküla, Alutaguse Parish, village in Alutaguse Parish, Ida-Viru County
- Aruküla, Lüganuse Parish, village in Lüganuse Parish, Ida-Viru County
- Aruküla, Järva County, village in Järva Parish, Järva County
- Aruküla, Lääne-Viru County, village in Vinni Parish, Lääne-Viru County
- Aruküla, Pärnu County, village in Lääneranna Parish, Pärnu County
- Aruküla, Rapla County, village in Märjamaa Parish, Rapla County
- Rootsi-Aruküla, village in Lääneranna Parish, Pärnu County, known as Aruküla before 2017 when located in Lihula Parish, Lääne County
