= Väike-Pungerja =

Village in Estonia

Coordinates: 59°11′N 27°22′E

- Village
- Interactive map of Väike-Pungerja
- Country: Estonia
- County: Ida-Viru County
- Parish: Alutaguse Parish
- Time zone: UTC+2 (EET)
  - Summer (DST): UTC+3 (EEST)

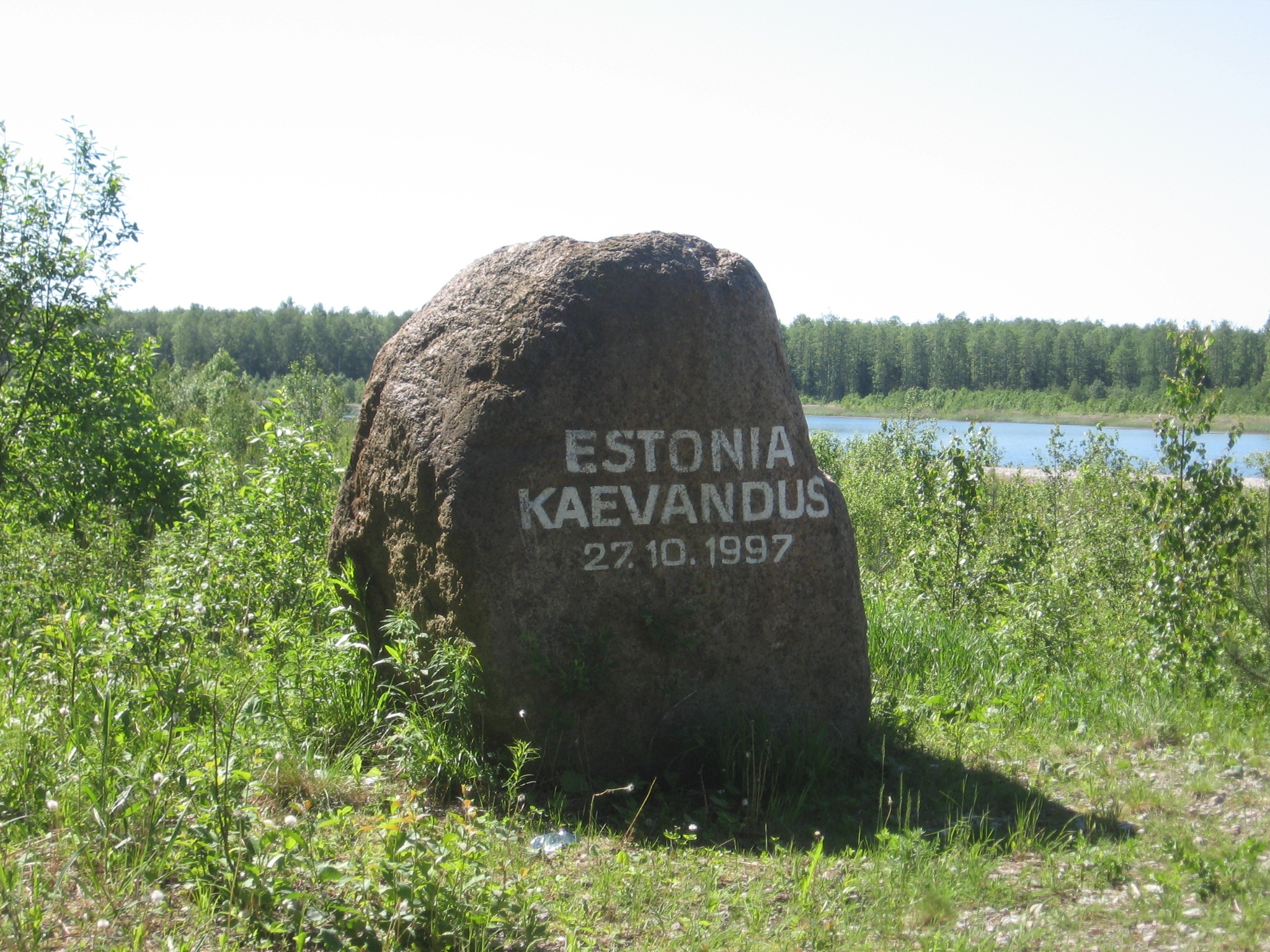
Estonia mine sedimentation basin no. 4, in use since 1997. Väike-Pungerja, Ida-Viru County

Väike-Pungerja is a village in Alutaguse Parish, Ida-Viru County in northeastern Estonia. Prior to the 2017 administrative reform of local governments, it was located in Mäetaguse Parish.

The entrance of the Estonia oil shale mine is located in Väike-Pungerja.
