= Lake Ratva =

Lake in Estonia

- Ratva järv (Estonian)
- Location within Estonia
- Coordinates: 59°13′13″N 27°13′38″E
- Basin countries: Estonia
- Max. length: 670 meters (2,200 ft)
- Max. width: 500 meters (1,600 ft)
- Surface area: 22.6 hectares (56 acres)
- Average depth: 1.0 meter (3 ft 3 in)
- Max. depth: 1.5 meters (4 ft 11 in)
- Shore length^{1}: 2,930 meters (9,610 ft)
- Surface elevation: 54.5 meters (179 ft)
- Islands: 1
- ^{1} Shore length is not a well-defined measure.

Lake Ratva (Estonian: Ratva järv) is a lake in Estonia. It is located in Metsküla in Alutaguse Parish, Ida-Viru County, 140 kilometers (87 mi) east of the Estonian capital of Tallinn. Mainly mixed forest grows around Lake Ratva.

== Physical description ==
The lake has an area of 22.6 hectares (56 acres), and it has one island with an area of 0.6 hectares (1.5 acres). The lake has an average depth of 1.0 meter (3 ft 3 in) and a maximum depth of 1.5 meters (4 ft 11 in). It is 670 meters (2,200 ft) long, and its shoreline measures 2,930 meters (9,610 ft). It stretches 500 meters (1,600 ft) in an east–west direction. Lake Ratva is 54.5 meters (179 ft) above sea level.

== See also ==
- List of lakes of Estonia
