= Metsküla, Ida-Viru County =

Village in Estonia

Metsküla
- Village
- Location in Estonia
- Coordinates: 59°10′35″N 27°14′09″E
- Country: Estonia
- County: Ida-Viru County
- Municipality: Alutaguse Parish

Population (2011 Census)
  - Total: 13

Metsküla is a village in Alutaguse Parish, Ida-Viru County in northeastern Estonia. It is located just southwest of Mäetaguse, the administrative centre of the municipality, and about 9 km (6 mi) northwest of Iisaku. As of the 2011 census, there were 13 people living there. Prior to the 2017 administrative reform of local governments, it was located in Mäetaguse Parish.

The Selisoo Bog and parts of Muraka and Ratva bogs are located on the territory of Metsküla.

== Gallery ==
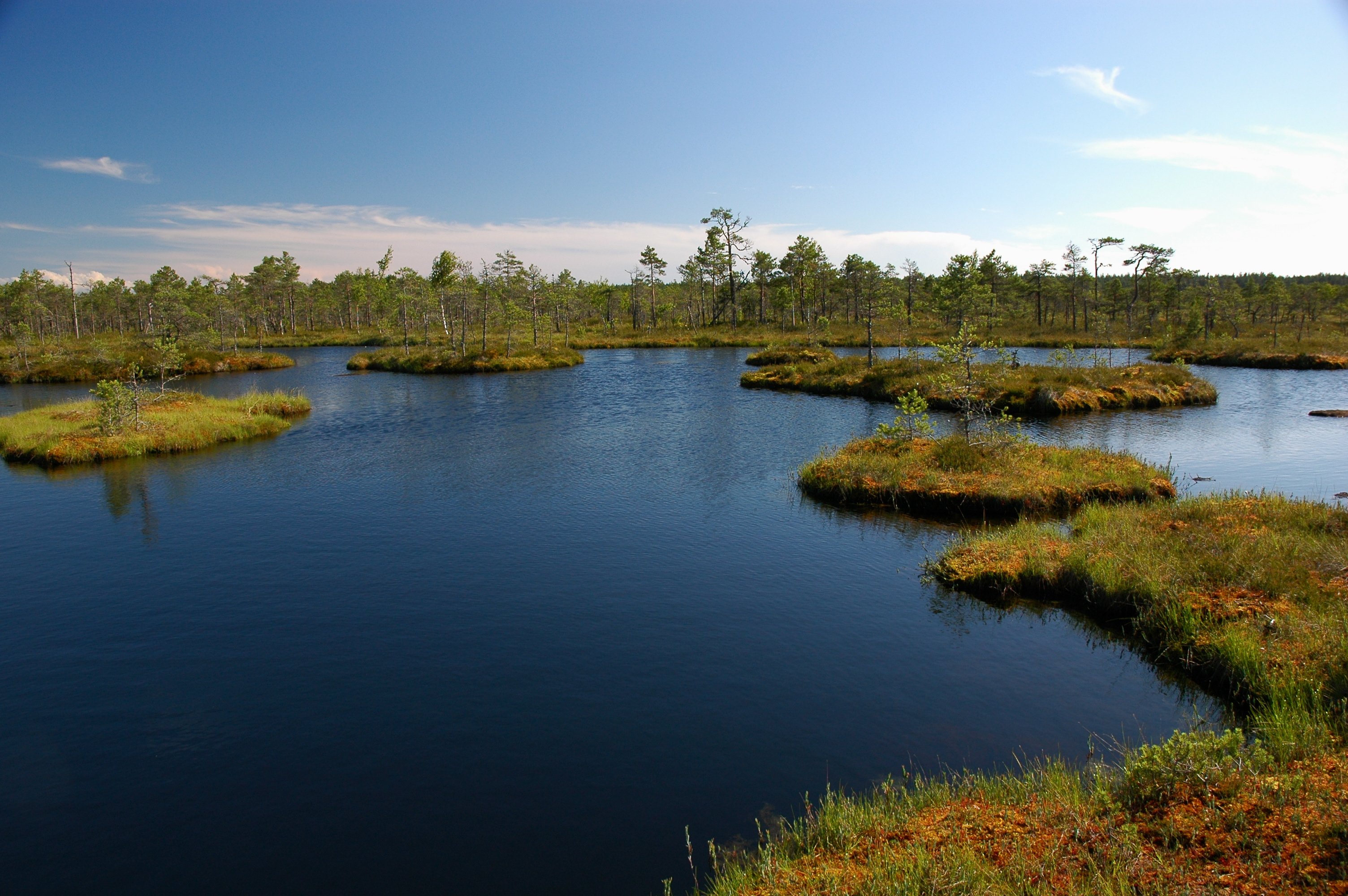
Selisoo Bog

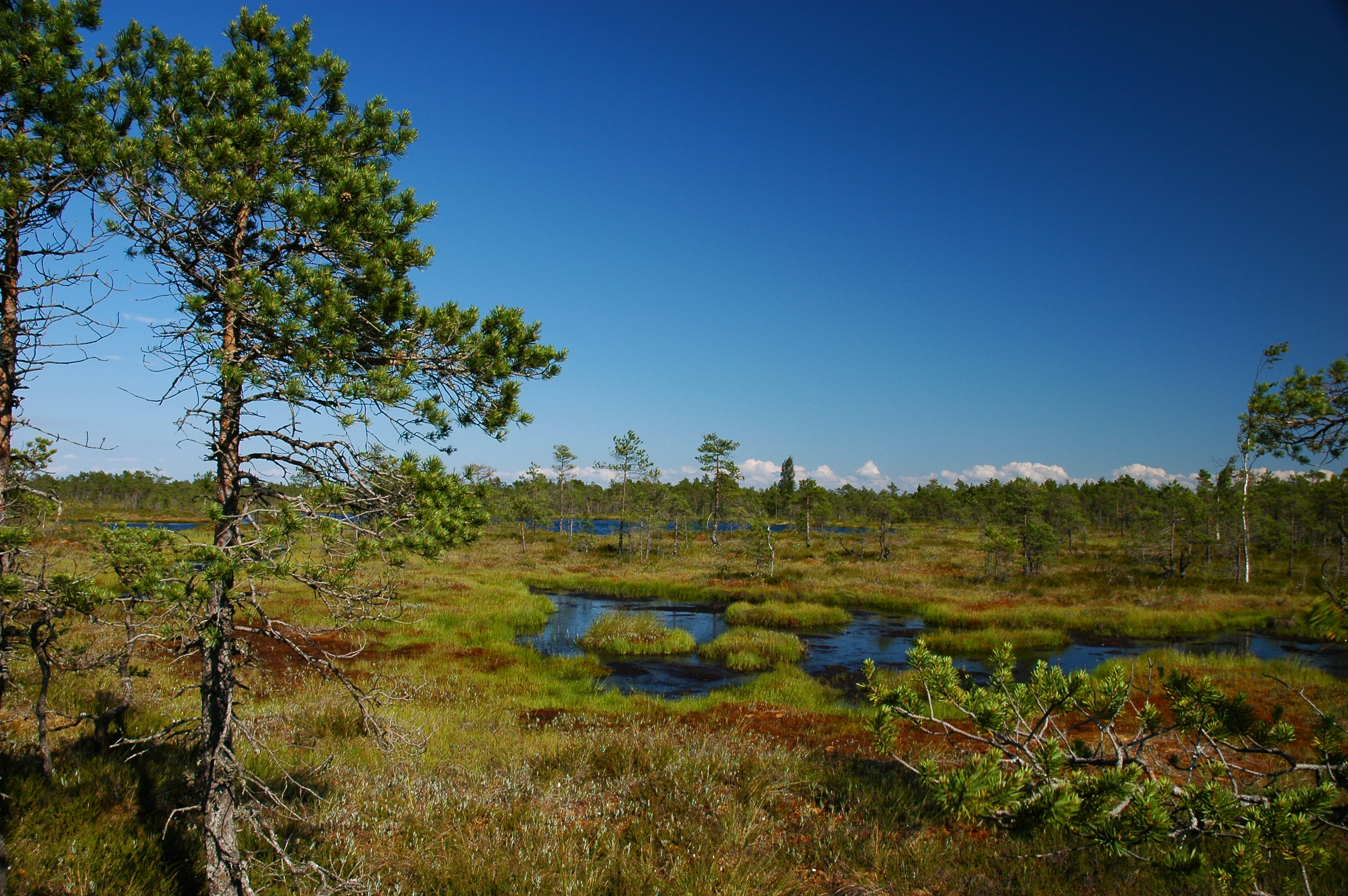
Selisoo Bog

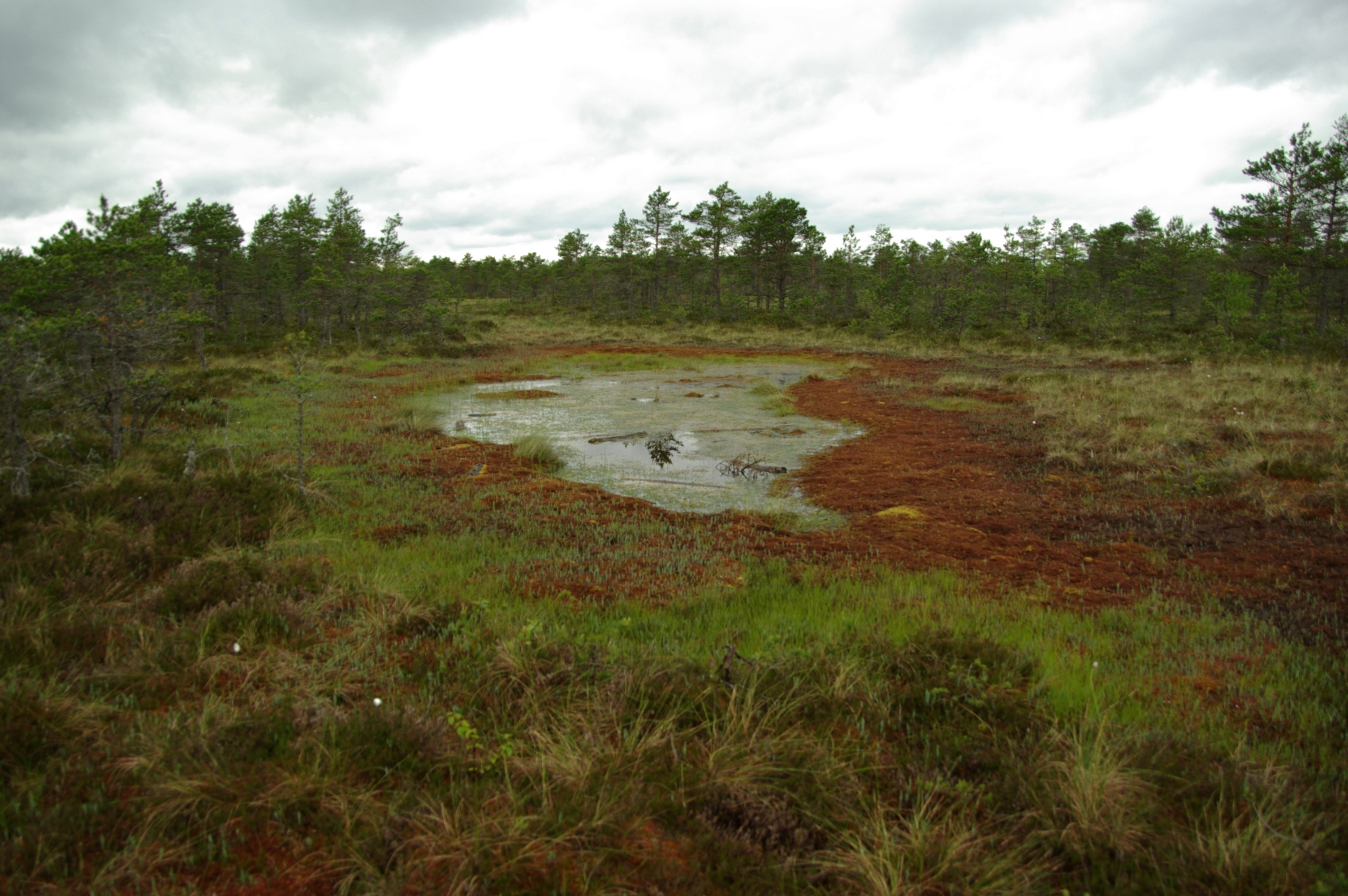
Selisoo Bog

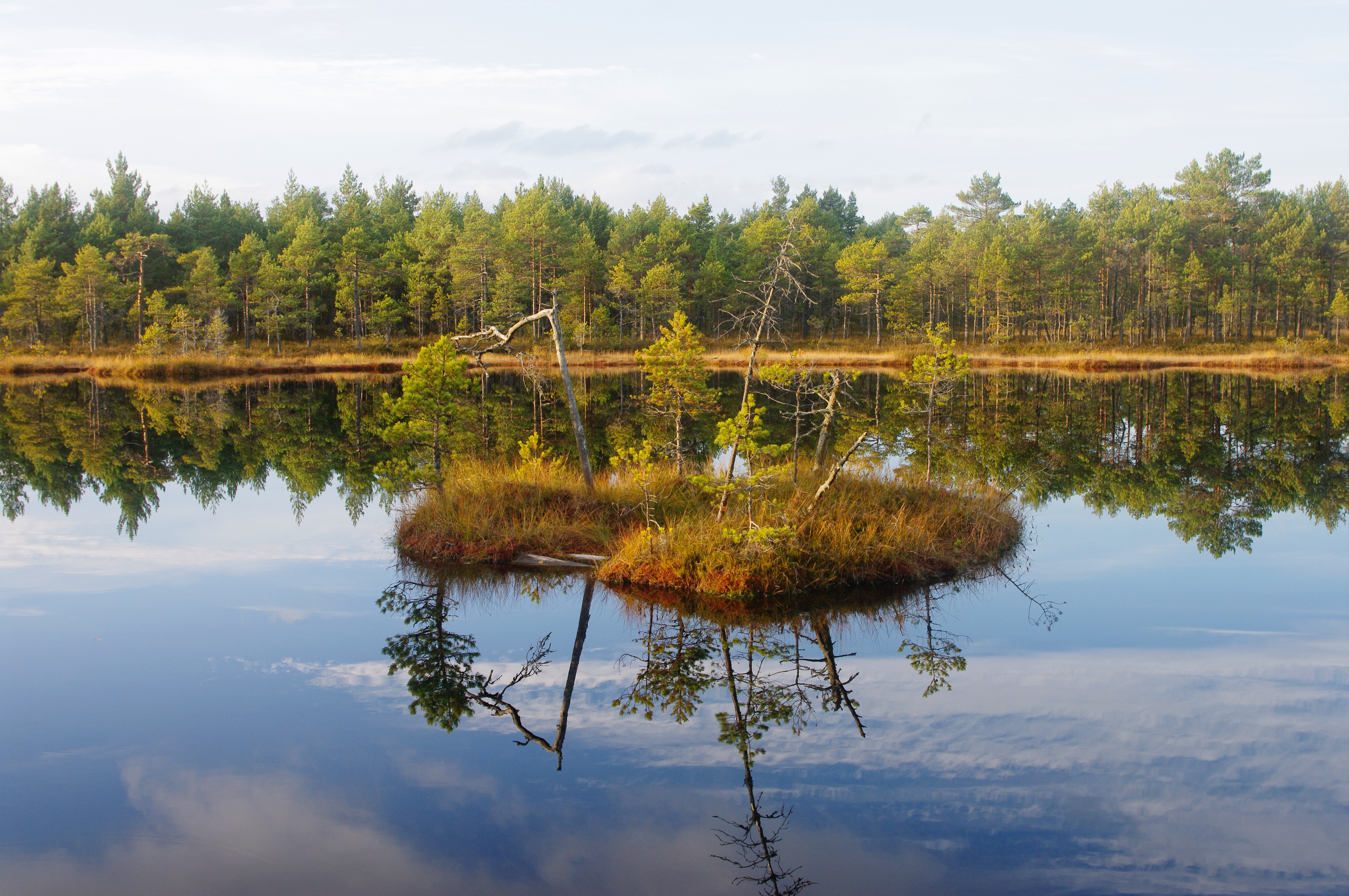
Selisoo Bog Lake
