= Tudulinna =

Borough in Estonia

Coordinates: 59°02′13″N 27°04′54″E

- Village
- Tudulinna church
- Interactive map of Tudulinna
- Country: Estonia
- County: Ida-Viru County
- Parish: Alutaguse Parish

Population (2011 Census)
  - Total: 220
- Time zone: UTC+2 (EET)
  - Summer (DST): UTC+3 (EEST)

Tudulinna (Estonian for 'sleepy town') is a village in Alutaguse Parish, Ida-Viru County in northeastern Estonia. It was the administrative centre of the former Tudulinna Parish. As of the 2011 census, the settlement's population was 220.
