= Rajaküla =

Rajaküla may refer to several places in Estonia:

- Rajaküla, Ida-Viru County, village in Alutaguse Parish, Ida-Viru County
- Rajaküla, Lääne-Viru County, village in Vinni Parish, Lääne-Viru County
