= Pesujärv =

Lake in Estonia

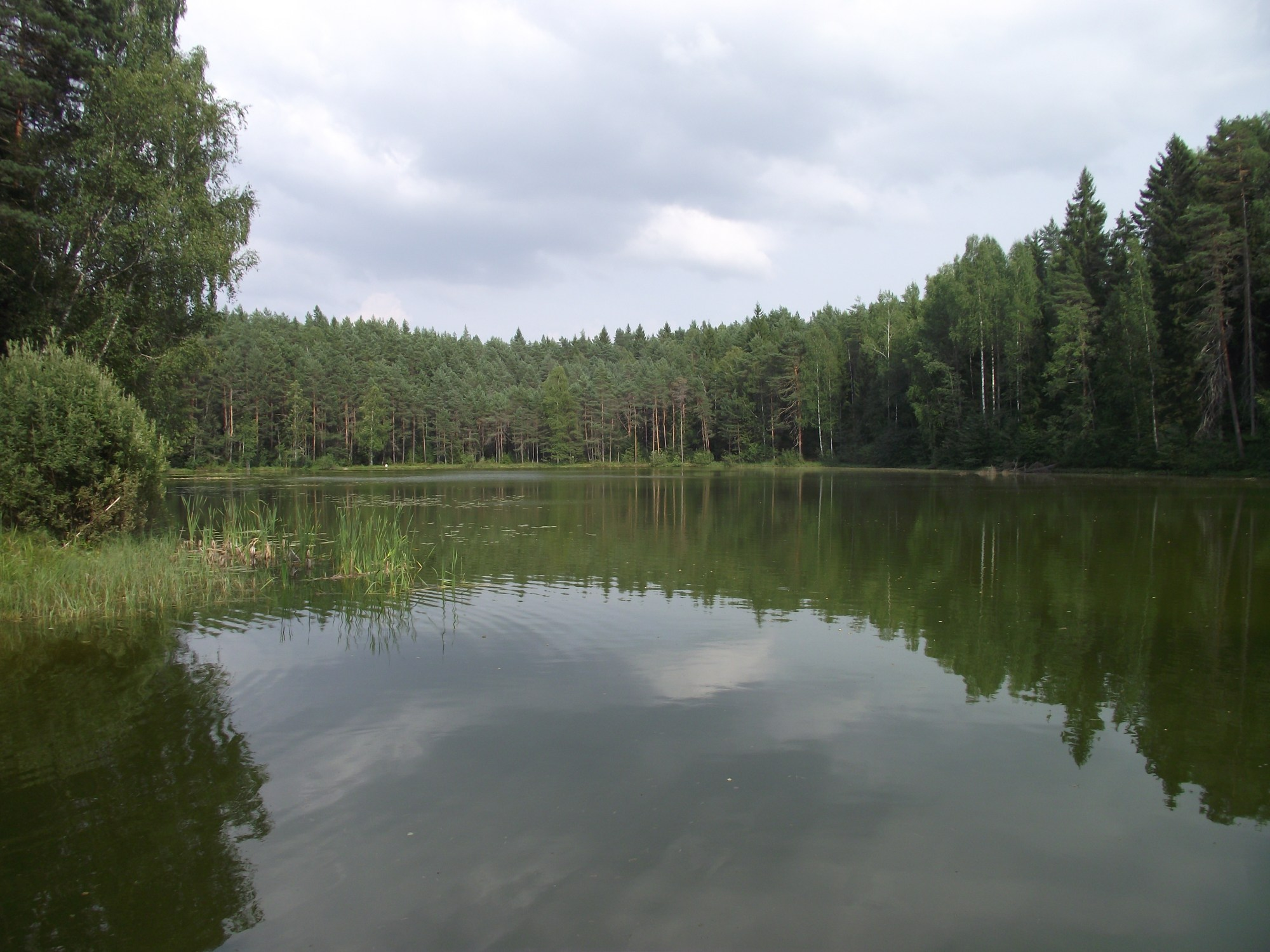

- Location within Estonia
- Coordinates: 59.1531398°N 27.3878329°E
- Basin countries: Estonia
- Max. length: 230 meters (750 ft)
- Surface area: 1.9 hectares (4.7 acres)
- Max. depth: 9.5 meters (31 ft)
- Shore length^{1}: 570 meters (1,870 ft)
- Surface elevation: 51.0 meters (167.3 ft)
- ^{1} Shore length is not a well-defined measure.

Pesujärv (also known as Jõuga Pesujärv, Jõugu järv, or 2. Jõuküla järv) is a lake in Estonia. It is located in the village of Jõuga in Alutaguse Parish, Ida-Viru County, close to the border with Russia.

== Physical description ==
The lake has an area of 1.9 hectares (4.7 acres). The lake has a maximum depth of 9.5 meters (31 ft). It is 230 meters (750 ft) long, and its shoreline measures 570 meters (1,870 ft).

== Gallery ==
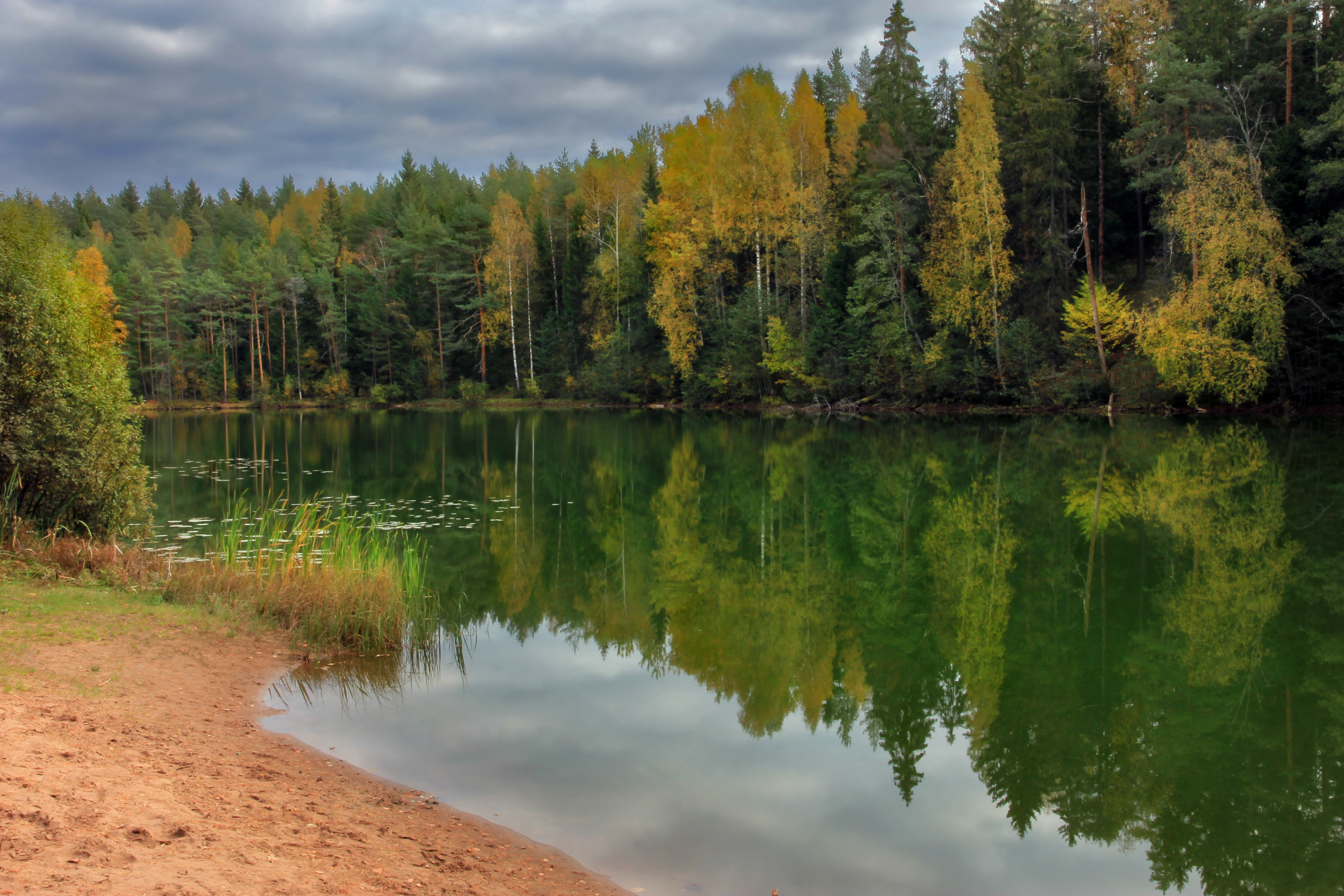
Pesujärv

== See also ==
- List of lakes of Estonia
