= Lake Imatu =

Lake in Estonia

- Location within Estonia
- Location: Ida-Viru County, Estonia
- Coordinates: 59°6′20″N 27°27′30″E
- Basin countries: Estonia
- Max. length: 730 meters (2,400 ft)
- Surface area: 28.2 hectares (70 acres)
- Average depth: 1.7 meters (5 ft 7 in)
- Max. depth: 2.0 meters (6 ft 7 in)
- Shore length^{1}: 2,080 meters (6,820 ft)
- Surface elevation: 44.5 meters (146 ft)
- ^{1} Shore length is not a well-defined measure.

Lake Imatu (Estonian: Imatu järv, also Immatu järv) is a lake in Estonia. It is located in the village of Imatu in Alutaguse Parish, Ida-Viru County. It borders the Agusalu Nature Reserve.

== Physical description ==
The lake has an area of 28.2 hectares (70 acres). The lake has an average depth of 1.7 meters (5 ft 7 in) and a maximum depth of 2.0 meters (6 ft 7 in). It is 730 meters (2,400 ft) long, and its shoreline measures 2,080 meters (6,820 ft).

== See also ==
- List of lakes of Estonia
