= Selisoo Nature Reserve =

Protected area in Estonia

- Location within Estonia
- Location: Estonia
- Coordinates: 59°10′30″N 27°15′00″E
- Area: 1,444 ha (3,570 acres)
- Established: 2015

Selisoo Nature Reserve is a nature reserve which is located in Ida-Viru County, Estonia.

The area of the nature reserve is 1,444 ha (3,570 acres) (14.44 km^{2} (5.58 sq mi)).

The protected area was founded in 2015 to protect valuable habitat types and threatened species in Metsküla village (former Mäetaguse Parish).
