= Kauksi =

Kauksi may refer to several places in Estonia:

- Kauksi, Ida-Viru County, village in Alutaguse Parish, Ida-Viru County
- Kauksi, Põlva County, village in Põlva Parish, Põlva County
