= Pagari =

Village in Estonia

Coordinates: 59°15′32″N 27°23′00″E

- Village
- Interactive map of Pagari
- Country: Estonia
- County: Ida-Viru County
- Parish: Alutaguse Parish
- Time zone: UTC+2 (EET)
  - Summer (DST): UTC+3 (EEST)

Pagari (German: Paggar) is a village in Alutaguse Parish, Ida-Viru County in northeastern Estonia. Prior to the 2017 administrative reform of local governments, it was located in Mäetaguse Parish.
