= Wojciech Lipnicki =

Polish Roman Catholic bishop and statesman

Wojciech Lipnicki was a 16th-century Polish Bishop and statesman.

Lipnicki was born about 1577 in Lipniku into the Hołobok noble house He was a Catholic priest, Royal Secretary, Canon of Kraków, administrator of the Wieliczka salt mine, and a bishop in Kraków and Laodicea in Phrygia (1645–1657). He died on 4 June 1657.
