= UHE =

The acronym UHE may have different meanings:

- In astronomy and high-energy physics, it means Ultra-High Energy (refers to energies around the PeV).
- Kunovice Airport - IATA code
- Unhexennium, a hypothetical chemical element with symbol Uhe
- Uhe, a village in Estonia
- Unión Hispanomundial de Escritores, a literary organization
