= Jõuga =

Village in Estonia

Coordinates: 59°09′N 27°22′E

- Village
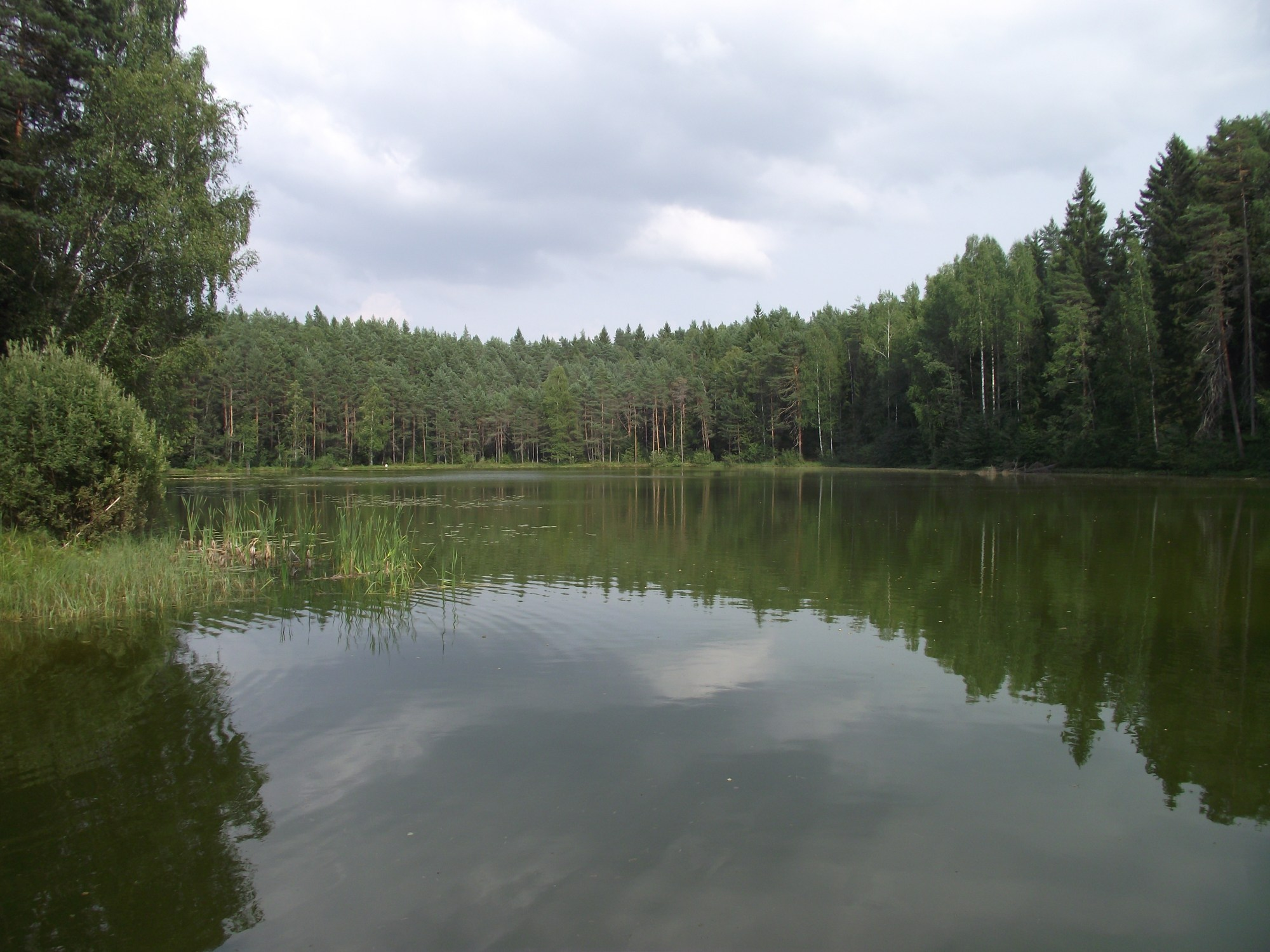
- Pesujärv, a lake in Jõuga
- Interactive map of Jõuga
- Country: Estonia
- County: Ida-Viru County
- Parish: Alutaguse Parish
- Time zone: UTC+2 (EET)
  - Summer (DST): UTC+3 (EEST)

Jõuga is a village in Alutaguse Parish, Ida-Viru County in northeastern Estonia.
