= Pootsiku =

Village in Estonia

Coordinates: 59°04′N 27°24′E

- Village
- Interactive map of Pootsiku
- Country: Estonia
- County: Ida-Viru County
- Parish: Alutaguse Parish
- Time zone: UTC+2 (EET)
  - Summer (DST): UTC+3 (EEST)

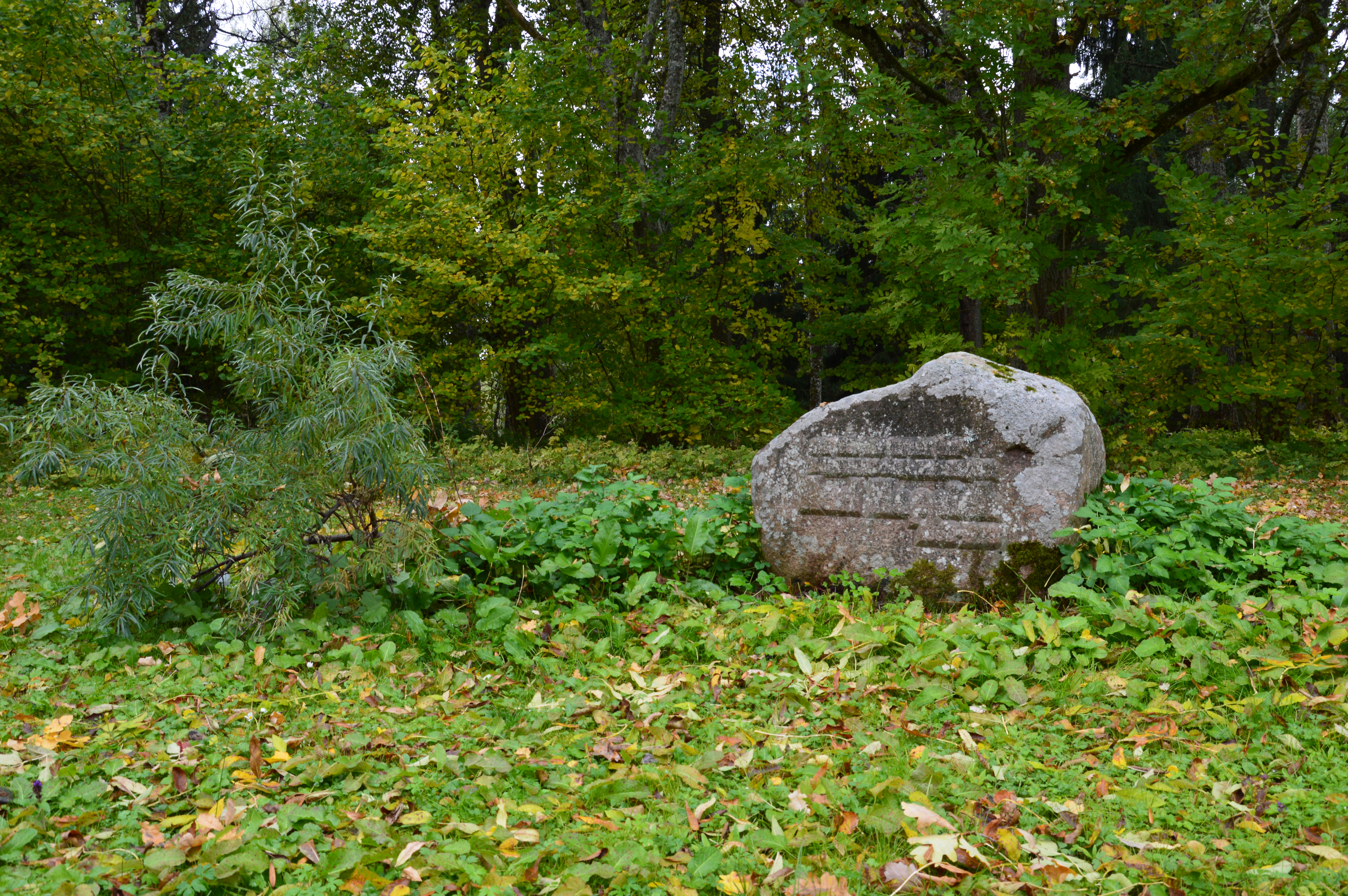
Karl Happich Memorial Stone in Pootsiku Village

Pootsiku is a village in Alutaguse Parish, Ida-Viru County in northeastern Estonia.
