= Alliku =

Alliku may refer to:

- Alliku, Harju County, a village in Saue Parish, Harju County, Estonia
- Alliku, Ida-Viru County, a village in Alutaguse Parish, Ida-Viru County, Estonia
- Rauno Alliku (born 1990), Estonian football player

== See also ==
- Allika (disambiguation)
