= Mati Raidma =

Estonian politician (born 1965)

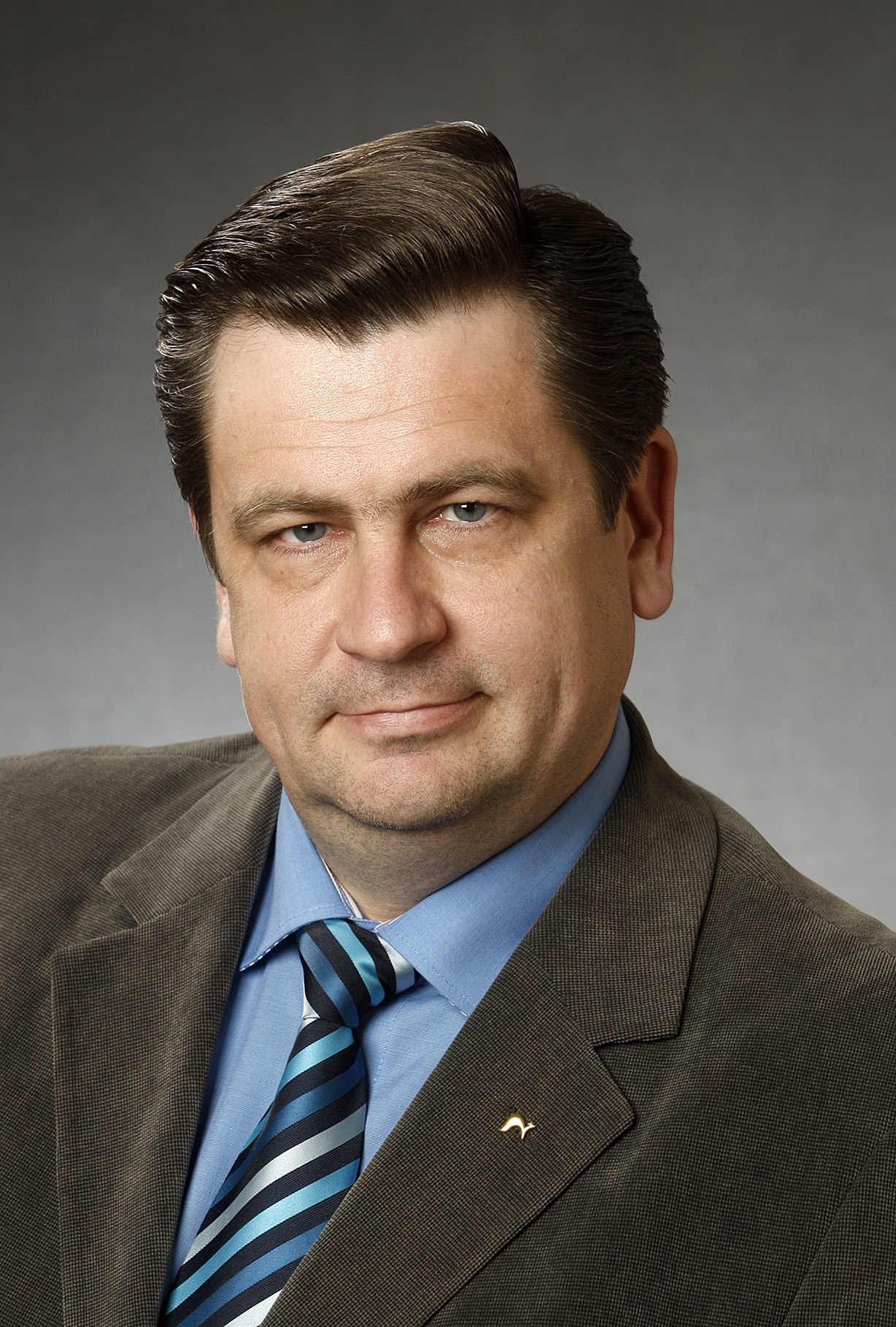
Mati Raidma

Mati Raidma (born 7 April 1965 in Iisaku, Ida-Viru County) is an Estonian politician. He has been a member of the IX, X, XI, XII, XIII and XIV Riigikogu. Since 2006, he has belonged to the Estonian Reform Party. From 2014 to 2015, he was the minister of the environment.
