= Pikati =

Village in Estonia

- Village
- Location within Estonia
- Coordinates: 59°01′N 27°01′E
- Country: Estonia
- County: Ida-Viru County
- Parish: Alutaguse Parish
- Time zone: UTC+2 (EET)
  - Summer (DST): UTC+3 (EEST)

Pikati is a village in Alutaguse Parish, Ida-Viru County in northeastern Estonia. At the end of 2011, it had a censed population of 28 inhabitants, but in 2021 the number had dropped to 21.
