= Kuru, Ida-Viru County =

Village in Estonia

Coordinates: 58°59′55″N 27°16′43″E

Kuru
- Village
- Interactive map of Kuru
- Country: Estonia
- County: Ida-Viru County
- Parish: Alutaguse Parish
- Time zone: UTC+2 (EET)
  - Summer (DST): UTC+3 (EEST)

Kuru is a village in Alutaguse Parish, Ida-Viru County in northeastern Estonia.
