= Allika =

Allika (lit. "source of water") may refer to several places in Estonia:

== Places ==
- Allika, Saue Parish, village in Saue Parish, Harju County
- Allika, Kuusalu Parish, village in Kuusalu Parish, Harju County
- Allika, Hiiu County, village in Hiiumaa Parish, Hiiu County
- Allika, Lääne County, village in Haapsalu, Lääne County
- Allika, Lääne-Viru County, village in Vinni Parish, Lääne-Viru County
- Allika, Pärnu County, village in Lääneranna Parish, Pärnu County

== People ==
- Marno Allika (born 1982), Estonian fencer

== See also ==
- Alliku (disambiguation)
