= Allika, Kuusalu Parish =

Village in Estonia

Coordinates: 59°27′36″N 25°24′47″E

Allika
- Village
- Interactive map of Allika
- Country: Estonia
- County: Harju County
- Parish: Kuusalu Parish
- Time zone: UTC+2 (EET)
  - Summer (DST): UTC+3 (EEST)

Allika is a village in Kuusalu Parish, Harju County in northern Estonia.

== Name ==
Allika was attested in written sources as part of the personal names Hallika Jürg in 1706 and Allika Juhan in 1782, and as Hallika in 1922. The name means 'spring' (the genitive case of allikas 'spring, source'). The name was first applied to the village in the 1920s; prior to this, it was an area of scattered farms—one of which, the Allika farm (mentioned in 1706), gave the village its name. The farm was named after the springs located there; these are now the ponds located on the Allika and Tiigi properties.
