= Kauksi, Ida-Viru County =

Village in Estonia

Coordinates: 58.9939°N 27.22791°E

Kauksi
- Village
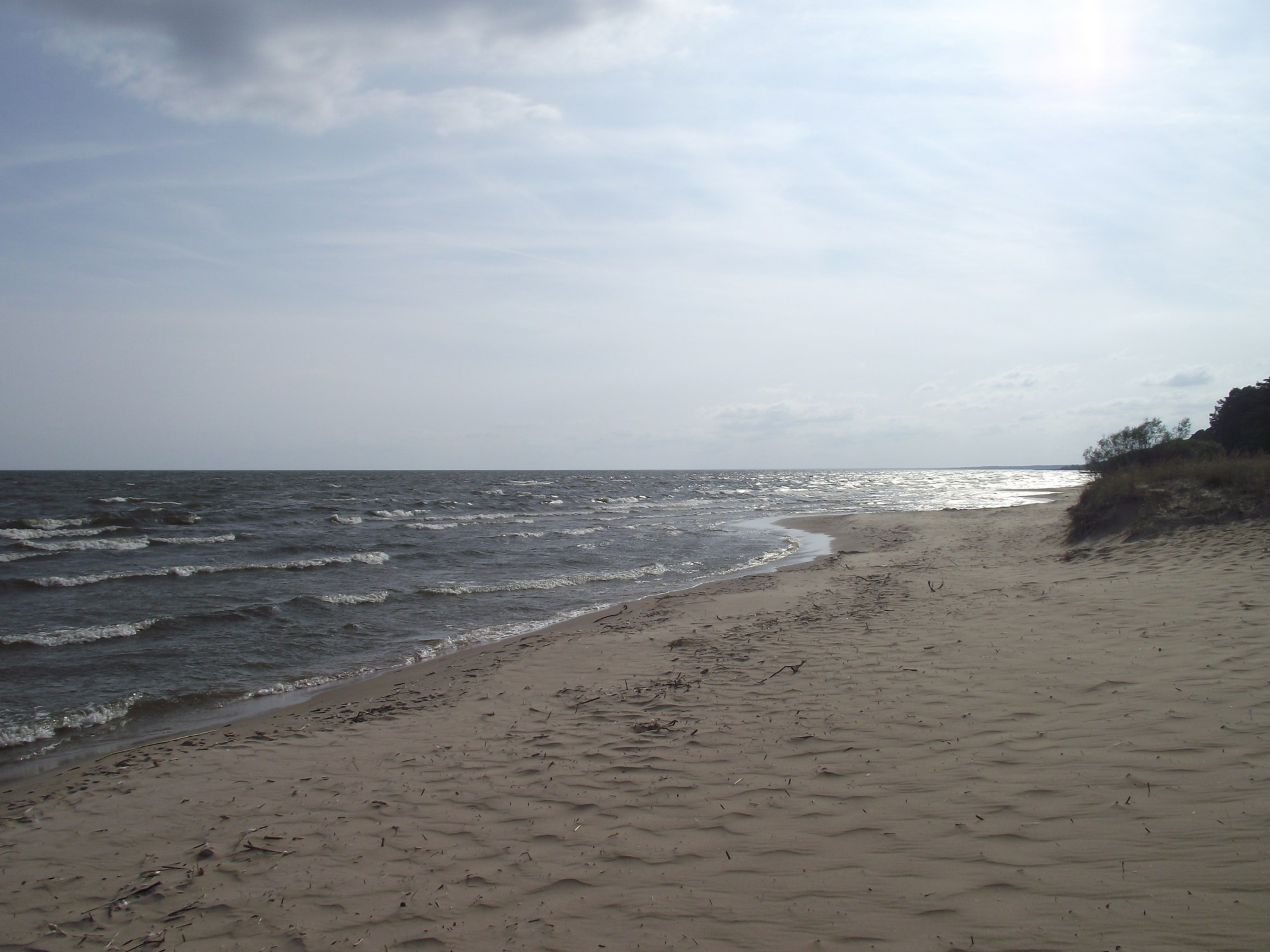
- Interactive map of Kauksi
- Country: Estonia
- County: Ida-Viru County
- Parish: Alutaguse Parish
- Time zone: UTC+2 (EET)
  - Summer (DST): UTC+3 (EEST)

Drone video of Kauksi beach in July 2022

Kauksi (German: Kauks) is a small village in Alutaguse Parish, Ida-Viru County in northeastern Estonia. Kauksi has a population of 59 (as of 1 January 2006). It lies on the northern side of Estonia's largest lake, Lake Peipus.

Kauksi was first named in 1543 in an old historical document. In 1732 the town belonged to the goods company Maidla. In the 18th century a separate goods company was established between Lake Peipus and Kauksi. It was owned by the Russian nobleman Michailo Rudneff. The estate had its own port with a ferry connection to Tartu.

Kauksi is a favourite tourist destination in the summer. It is located one km from the road between Tartu and Jõhvi. From here, a sandy beach runs almost unbroken along the shore of Lake Peipus until Vasknarva. Air and water temperatures are on average higher than at any other Estonian resort. In 1961 a tourist centre opened in Kauksi.

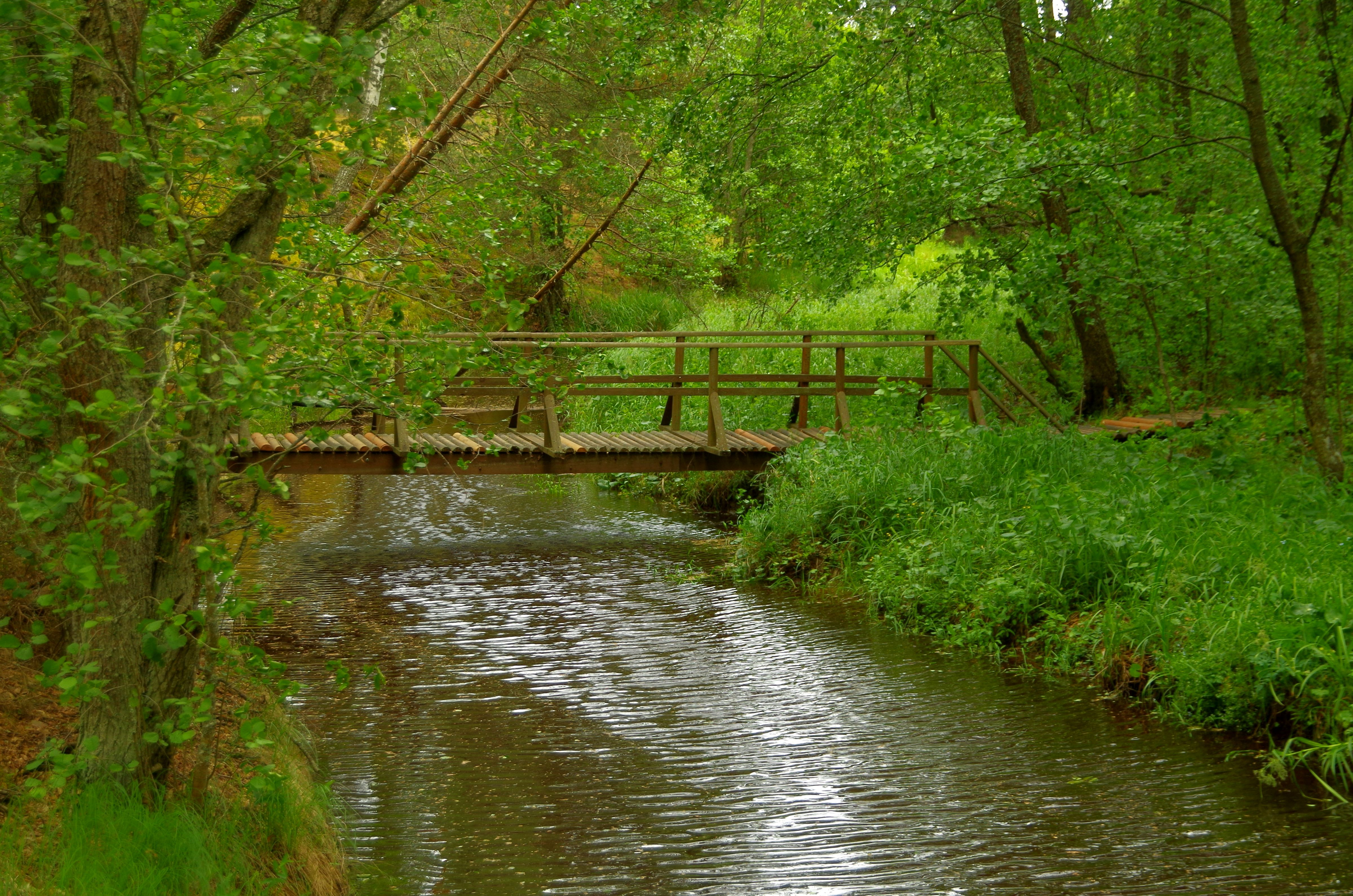
Bridge over Kauksi Creek in Kauksi
