= Jõetaguse, Lääne-Viru County =

Village in Estonia

Coordinates: 59°19′N 26°09′E

Jõetaguse
- Village
- Interactive map of Jõetaguse
- Country: Estonia
- County: Lääne-Viru County
- Parish: Kadrina Parish
- Time zone: UTC+2 (EET)
  - Summer (DST): UTC+3 (EEST)

Jõetaguse is a village in Kadrina Parish, Lääne-Viru County, in northeastern Estonia. It lies on the right bank of the Loobu River, just south of Kadrina, the administrative centre of the municipality.
