= Mäetaguse =

Borough in Estonia

- Small borough
- Location in Estonia
- Coordinates: 59°13′31″N 27°17′41″E
- Country: Estonia
- County: Ida-Viru County
- Parish: Alutaguse Parish

Population (2011 Census)
  - Total: 555
- Time zone: UTC+2 (EET)
  - Summer (DST): UTC+3 (EEST)

Mäetaguse (German: Mehntack) is a small borough (alevik) in Ida-Viru County in Alutaguse Parish in northeastern Estonia. Prior to 2017, it was the administrative centre of Mäetaguse Parish. As of the 2011 census, the settlement's population was 555, of which the Estonians were 271 (48.8%).

== Mäetaguse Manor ==
Mäetaguse estate (German: Mehntack) was mentioned for the first time in written sources in 1542. Until the Estonian Declaration of Independence, it belonged to different Baltic German families, among others the Wrangel and von Rosen. Between 1923 and 1988 it served as a schoolhouse. Today it houses a hotel and spa.

== Gallery ==
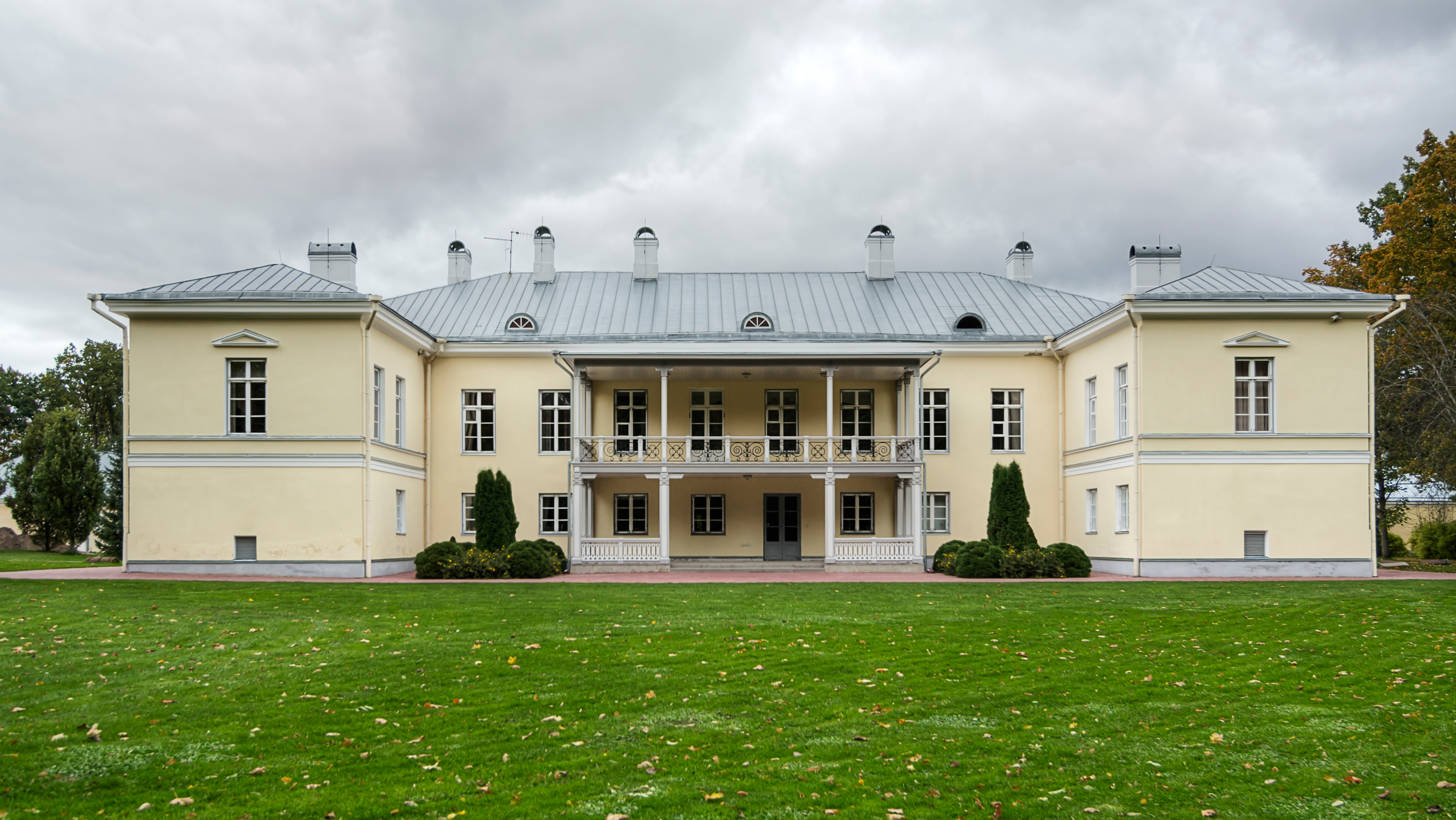
Mäetaguse manor main building

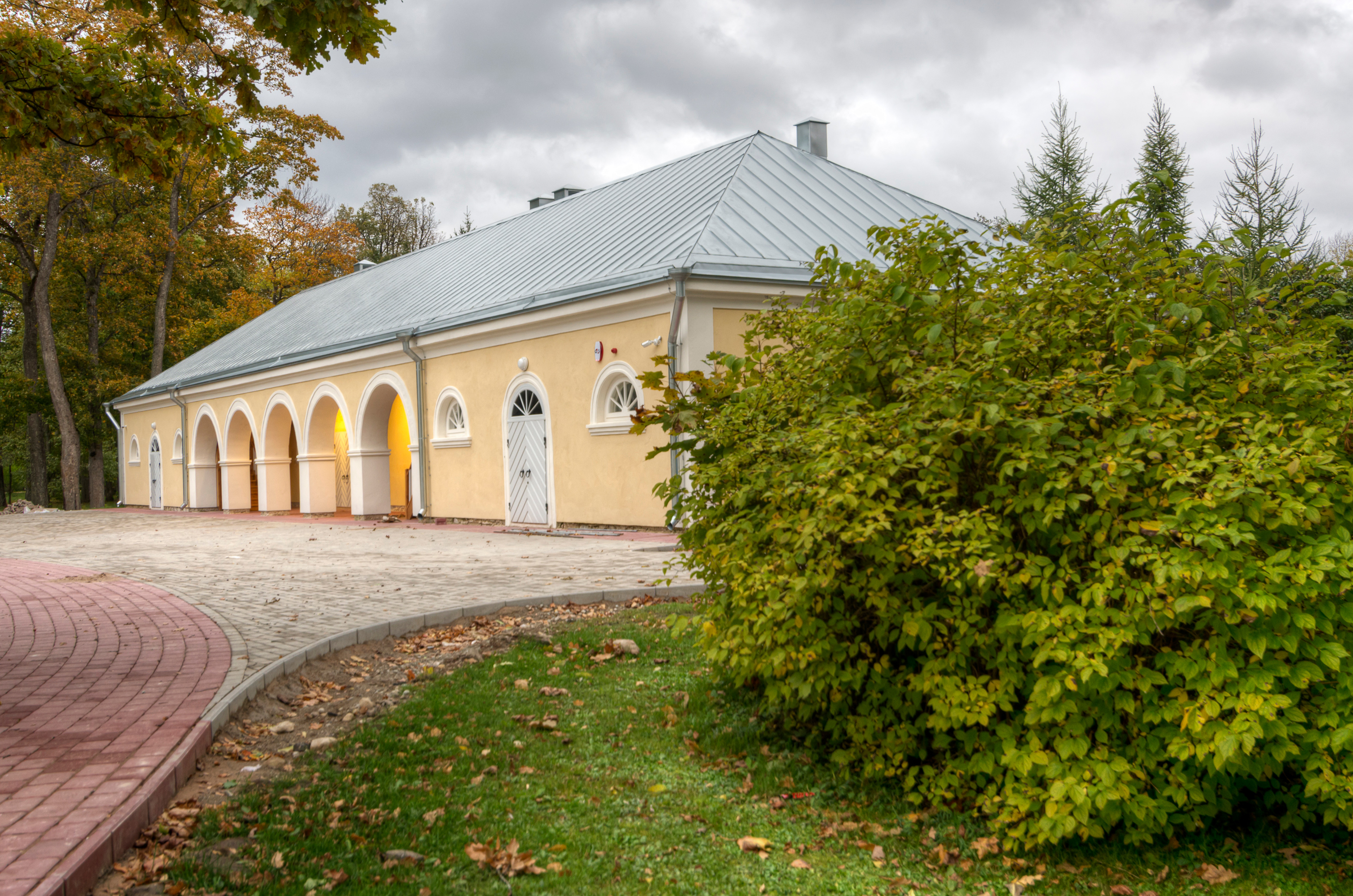
Mäetaguse manor granary

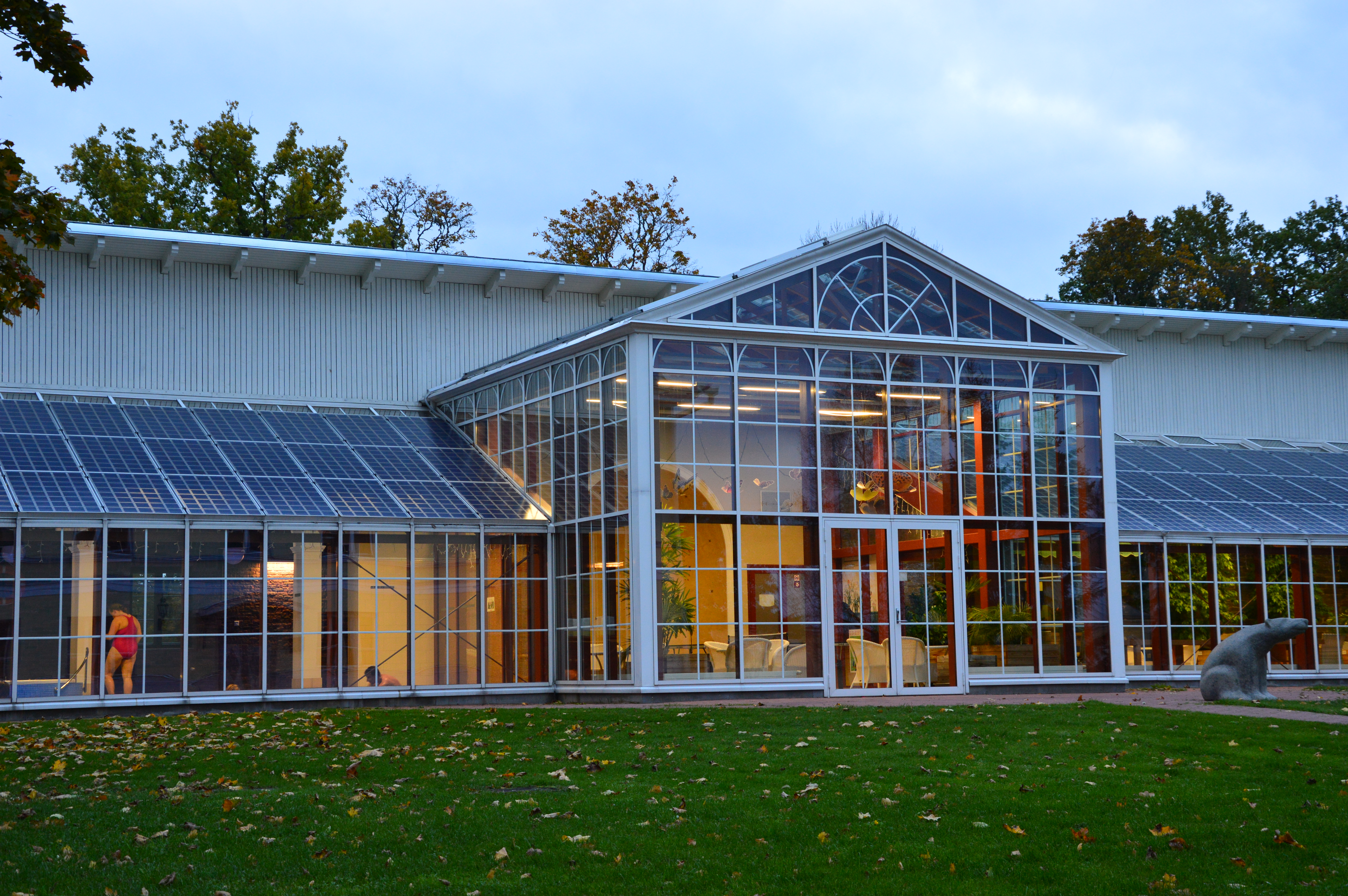
Mäetaguse manor greenhouse

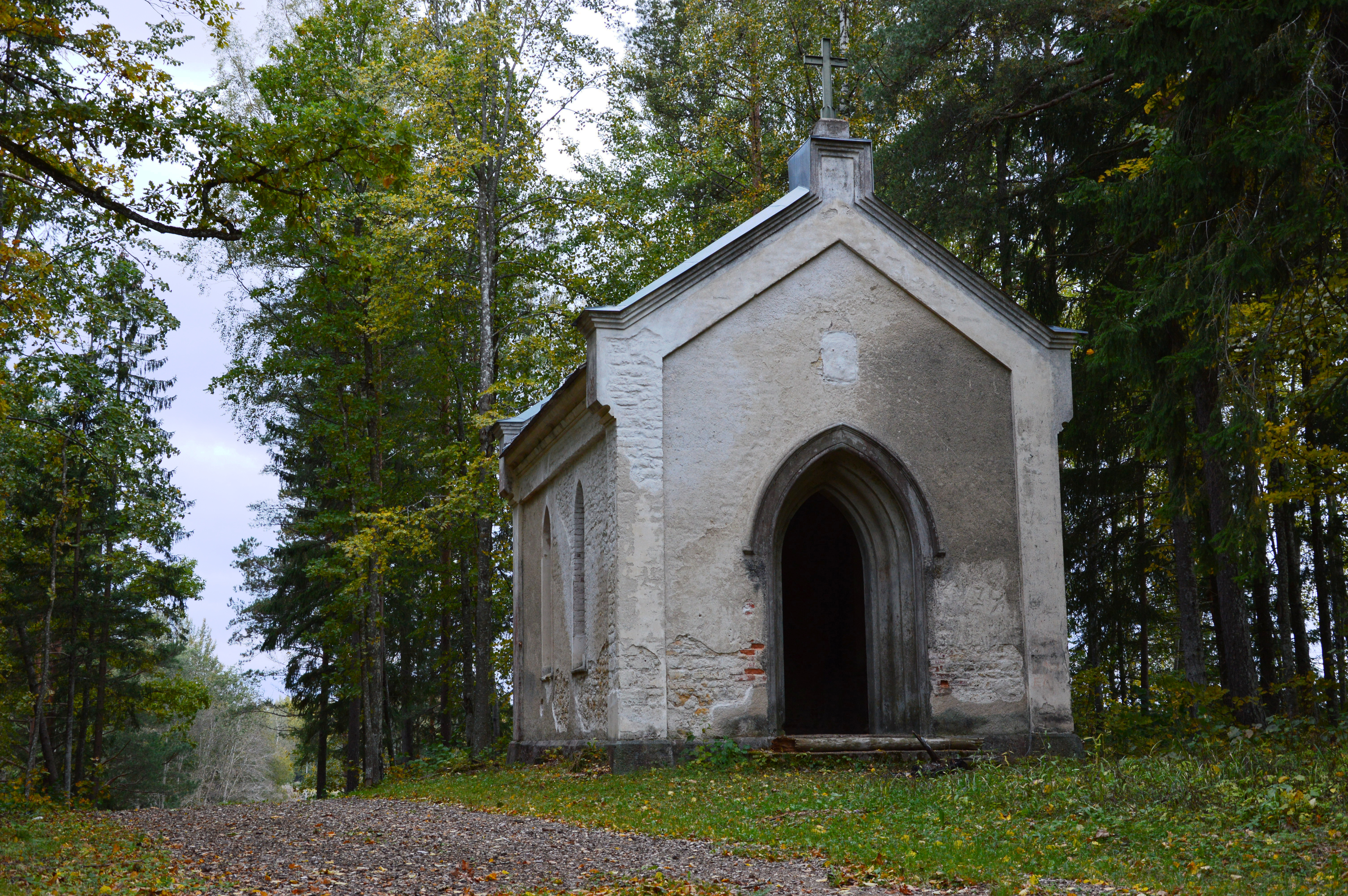
Mäetaguse chapel
