= Iisaku =

Borough in Estonia

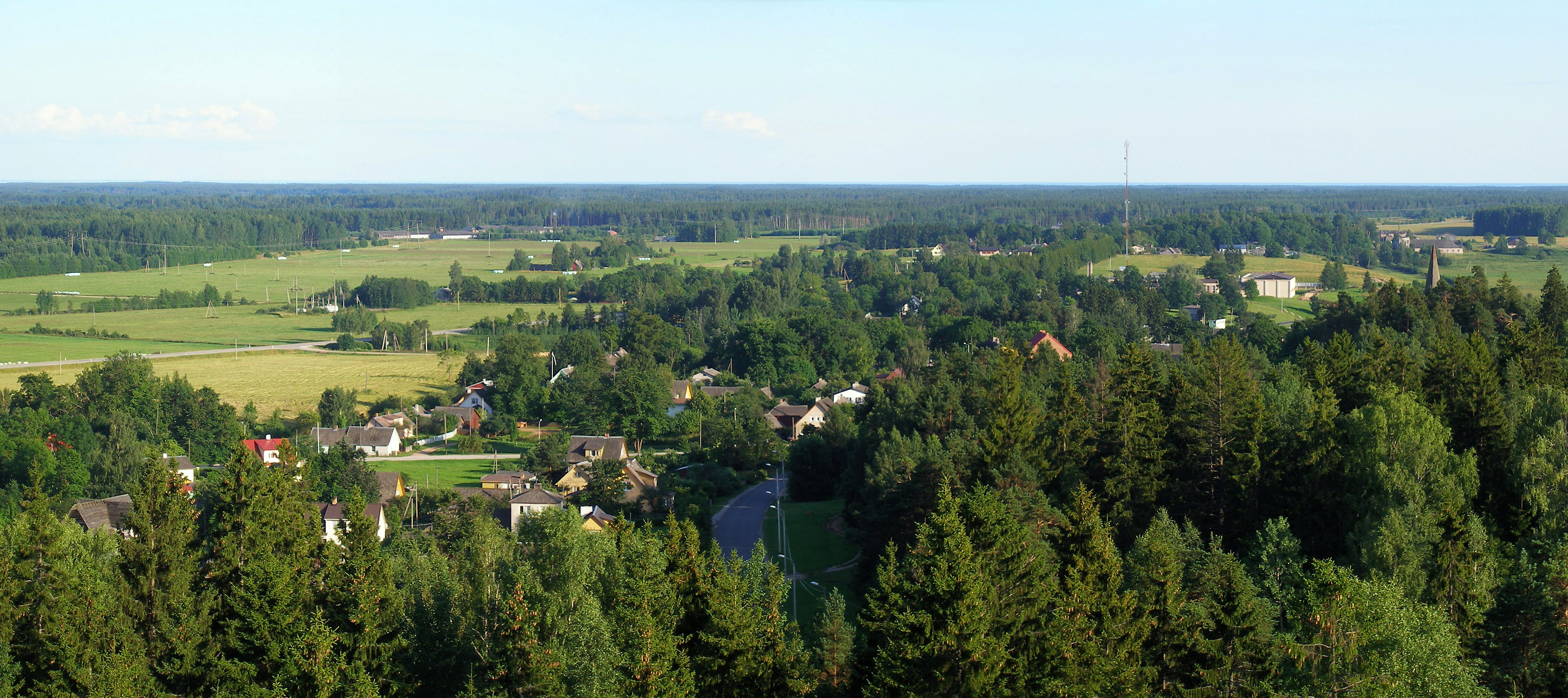
- View of Iisaku

- Location within Estonia
- Coordinates: 59°06′02″N 27°18′37″E
- Country: Estonia
- County: Ida-Viru County

Population (2011 Census)
  - Total: 761
- Time zone: UTC+2 (EET)

Iisaku (German: Isaak) is a small borough (alevik) in northeastern Estonia. It is located in Ida-Viru county in Alutaguse Parish, around 30 km south from the town of Jõhvi. Iisaku was the administrative centre of Iisaku Parish. As of the 2011 census, the settlement's population was 761, of which the Estonians were 717 (94.2%).
