= Mäetaguse Parish =

Former municipality of Estonia

Coordinates: 59°14′N 27°16′E

Mäetaguse Parish Mäetaguse vald
- Former municipality of Estonia
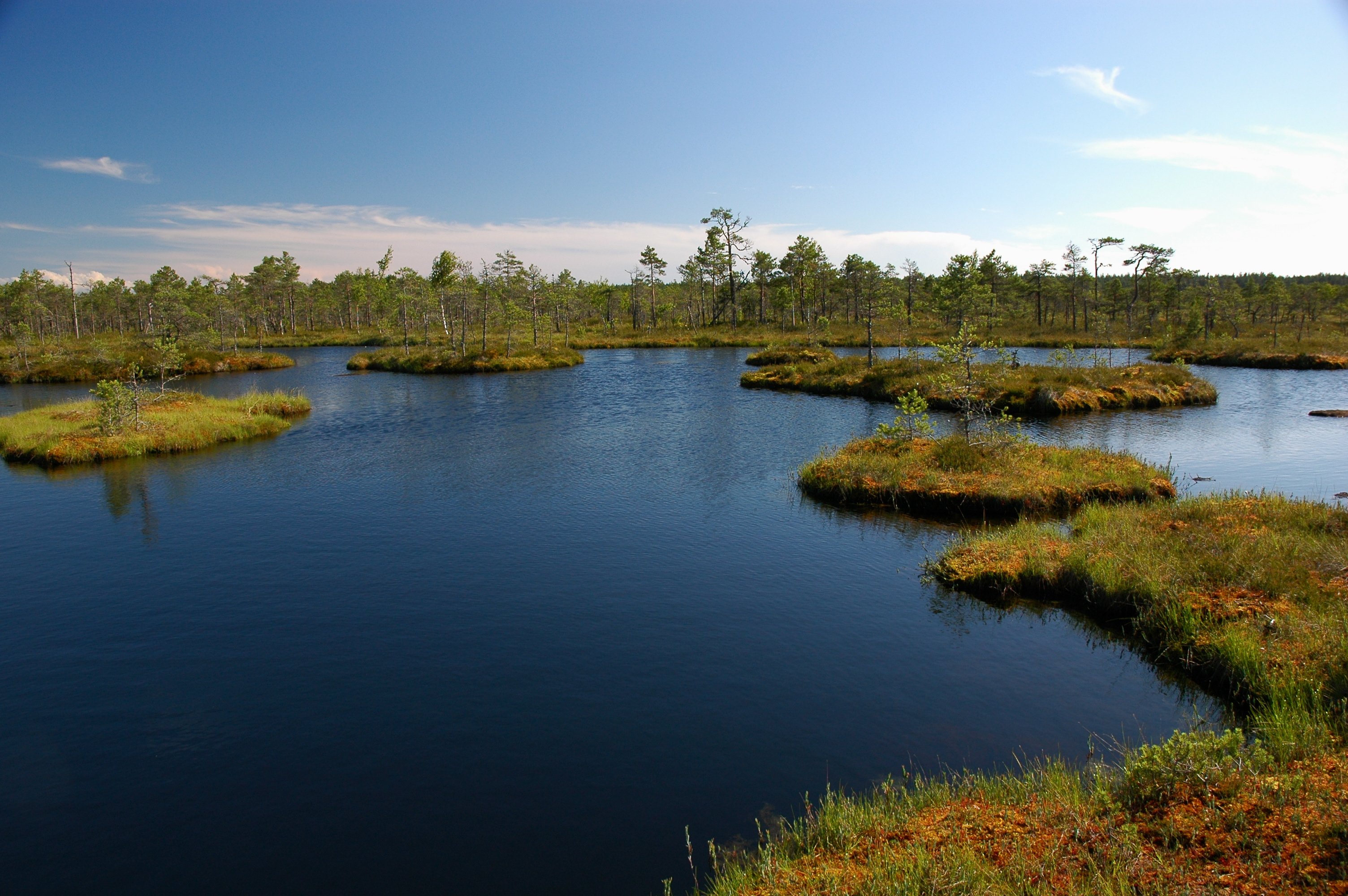
- Selisoo bog

- Flag Coat of arms

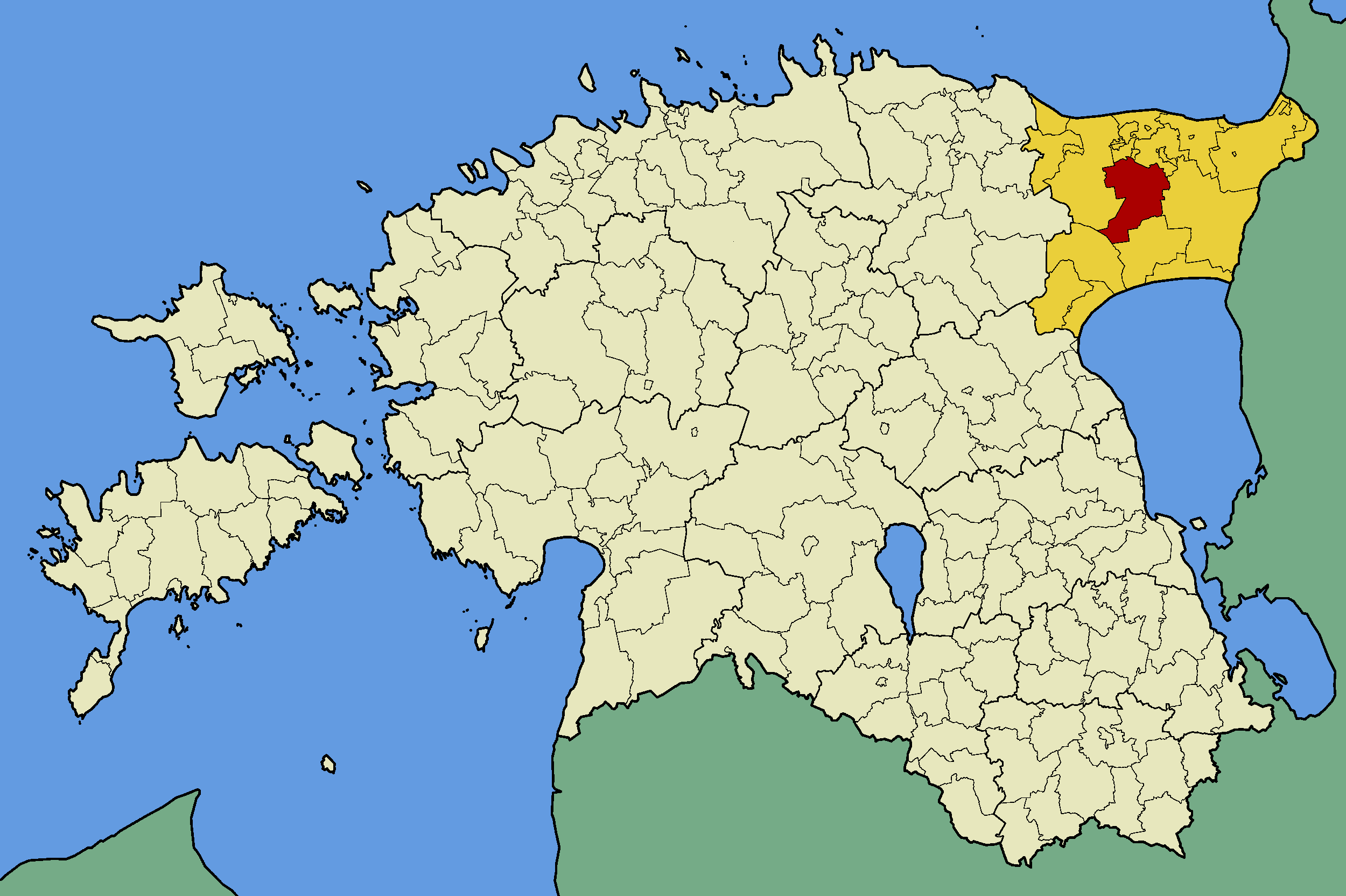
- Mäetaguse Parish within Ida-Viru County.
- Country: Estonia
- County: Ida-Viru County
- Administrative centre: Mäetaguse

Area
  - Total: 285 km^{2} (110 sq mi)

Population (2005)
  - Total: 1,556
  - Density: 5.46/km^{2} (14.1/sq mi)
- Website: www.maetagusevv.ee

Mäetaguse Parish (Estonian: Mäetaguse vald) was an Estonian municipality located in Ida-Viru County. It had a population of 1,556 (2005) and an area of 285 km^{2} (110 mi^{2}).

== Populated places ==
Mäetaguse Parish had a small borough, Mäetaguse, and 20 villages.

=== Villages ===
Apandiku, Aruküla, Arvila, Atsalama, Ereda, Jõetaguse, Kalina, Kiikla, Liivakünka, Metsküla, Mäetaguse, Pagari, Rajaküla, Ratva, Tarakuse, Uhe, Võhma, Võide, Võrnu, Väike-Pungerja.
