= Alutaguse Parish =

Municipality of Estonia (2017)

Alutaguse Parish Alutaguse vald
- Municipality
- Flag Coat of arms

- Alutaguse Parish within Ida-Viru County.
- Country: Estonia
- County: Ida-Viru County
- Administrative centre: Iisaku

Area
  - Total: 1,439.61 km^{2} (555.84 sq mi)

Population (2026)
  - Total: 4,545
  - Density: 3.157/km^{2} (8.177/sq mi)
- ISO 3166 code: EE-130
- Website: https://www.alutagusevald.ee/ https://www.alutaguse.com/et/

Alutaguse Parish (Estonian: Alutaguse vald) is a rural municipality in Ida-Viru County. The administrative centre is Iisaku. The parish was formed in 2017, as a result of the merger of Alajõe, Iisaku, Illuka, Mäetaguse, and Tudulinna rural municipalities. The parish is located on the plain north of Lake Peipus and it is the most sparsely populated municipality in Estonia, although it is the third largest in terms of territory. Due to its sparse population, the municipality has the largest proportion of forests in Estonia, as well as many bogs. Alutaguse National Park was formed from existing nature reserves in the region in 2018.

Pühtitsa Convent and Vasknarva Castle are located in of the parish.

== Demographics ==
As of 1 January 2026, the parish had 3,909 residents, of which 2,011 (51.4%) were women and 1,898 (48.6%) were men.

There are 2 small boroughs and 73 villages in the parish.

=== Religion ===
Among residents of the parish above 15 years of age, 18.2 per cent declared themselves to be Orthodox or an Old Believer, 10.5 per cent as Lutheran, while other Christian denominations made up 1.3 per cent of the population. The majority of residents of the parish, 67.8 per cent, were religiously unaffiliated. 3.5 per cent of the population followed other religions or did not specify their religious affiliation.

== Notable people ==
- Kristjan Haho (1877 in Oonurme – 1937), lawyer, judge and politician.
- Alfred Karindi (1901 in Ongassaare – 1969), organist and composer.
- Helend Peep (1910 in Vaikla – 2007), actor and singer
- Mart Vilt (1935 in Illuka - 2021), middle-distance runner, Estonian Athlete of the Year in 1966
- Ants Üleoja (born 1936 in Oonurme), choral conductor and professor of the Estonian Academy of Music and Theatre
- Enn Sellik (born 1954 in Iisaku), long-distance runner who competed at the 1976 and in the 1980 Summer Olympics
- Krista Aru (1958 in Pagari – 2025), politician, she studied the historian of journalism and museology. Director of Estonian National Museum 2006/2012
- Mati Raidma (born 1965 in Iisaku) politician, Minister of the environment, 2014 to 2015
- Hanno Pevkur (born 1977 in Iisaku), politician, Minister of Defence, 2022 to 2026

== Gallery ==
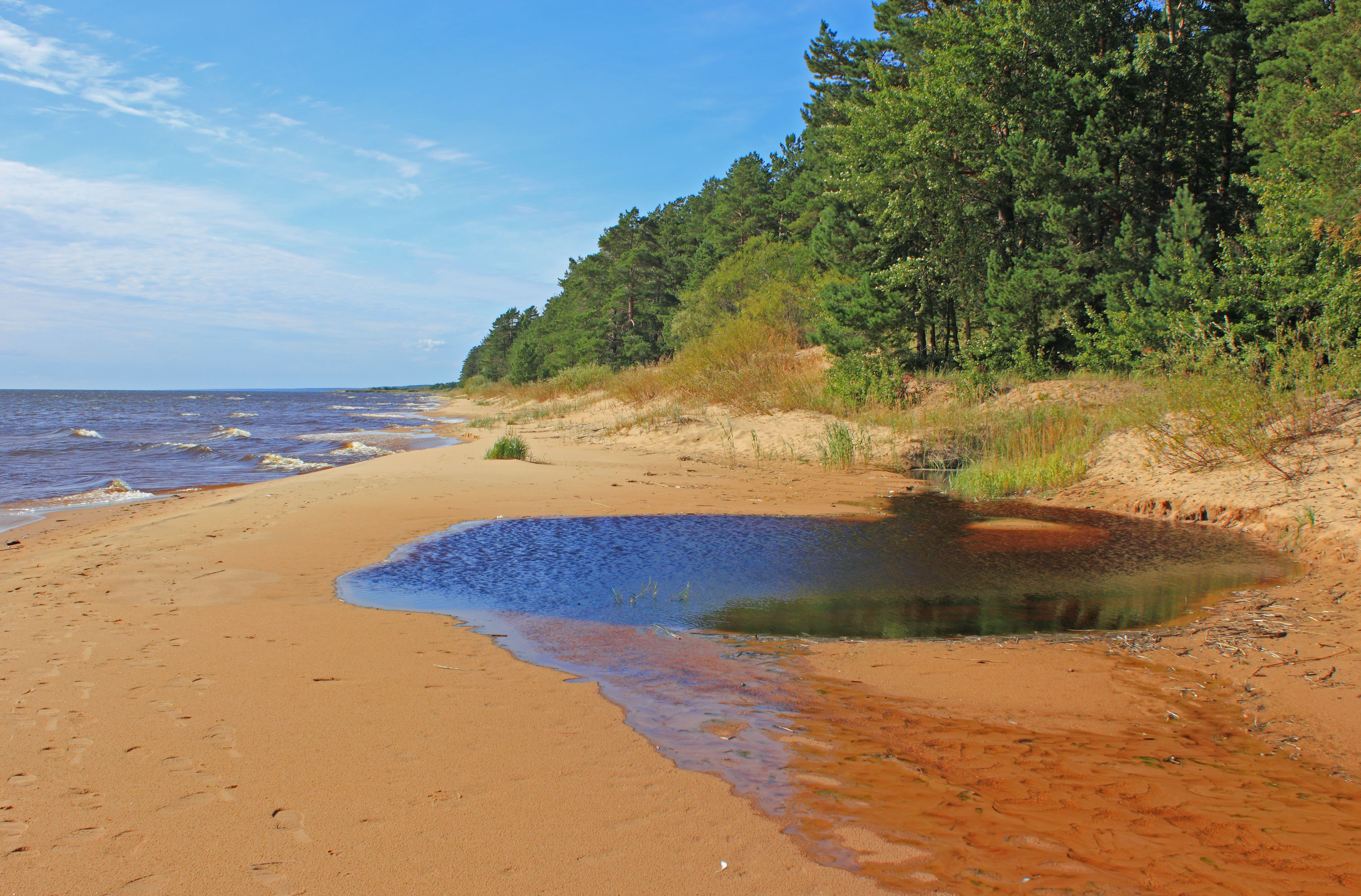
The shore of Lake Peipsi

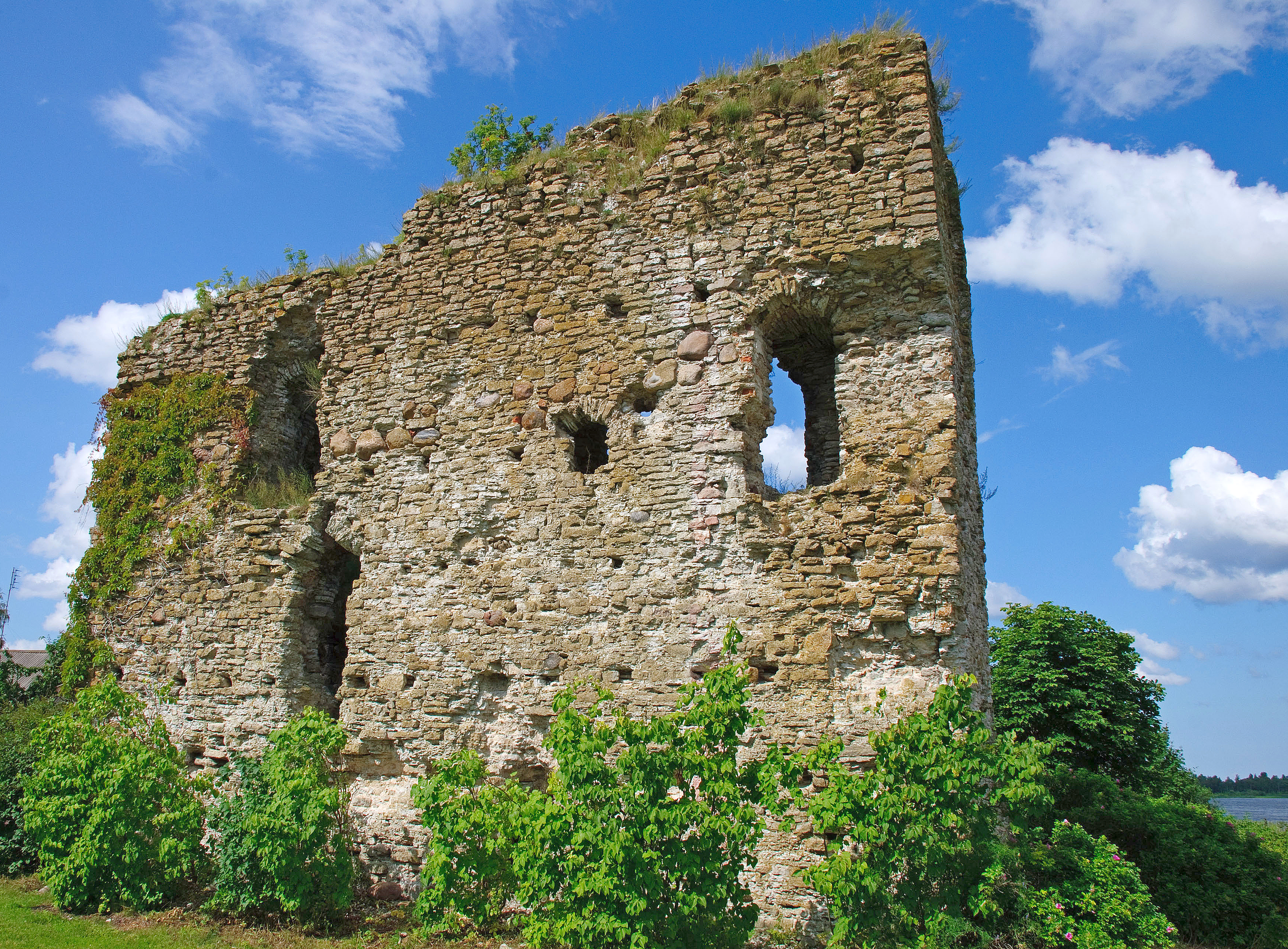
Ruins of Vasknarva Castle

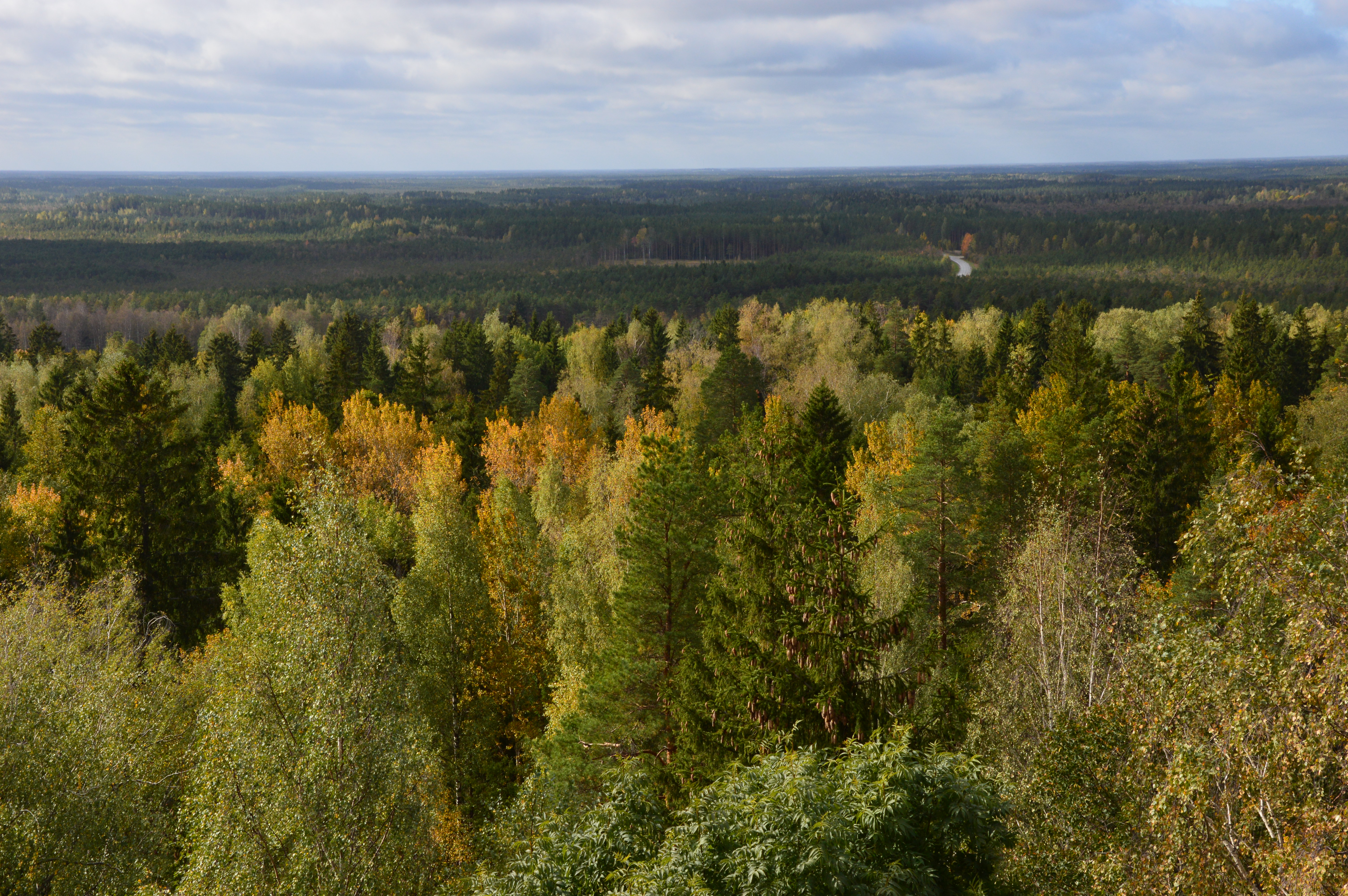
Alutaguse forests
