= Kurtna Lake District =

Group of lakes in Estonia

Kurtna Landscape Protection Area
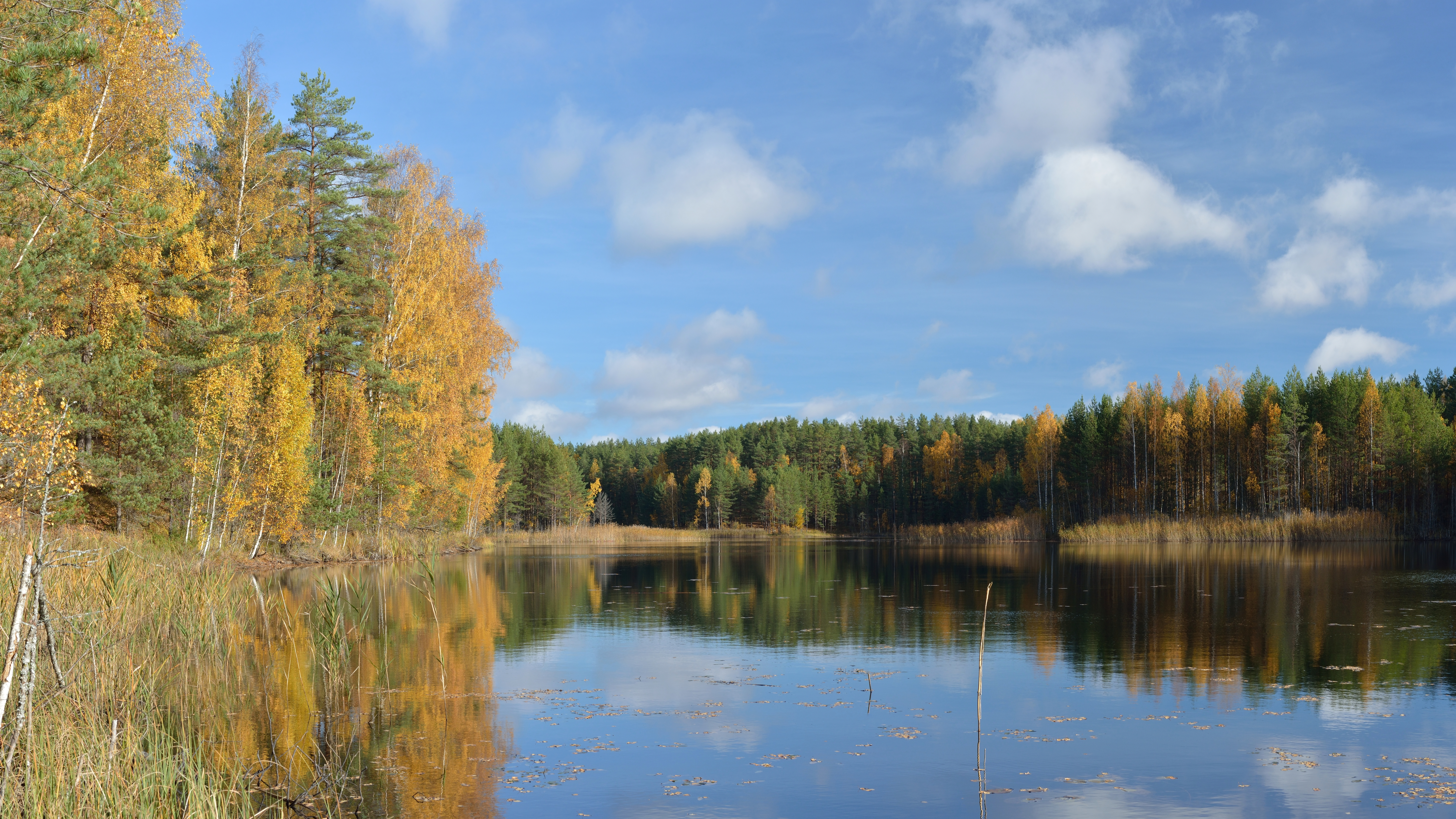
- Kurtna Ahnejärv Lake

- Location within Estonia
- Location: Estonia
- Coordinates: 59°15′N 27°34′E
- Area: 2,820 ha (7,000 acres)
- Established: (1987) 2005

The Kurtna Lake District is located in north-eastern Estonia. It consists of about 40 lakes within an area of 30 hectares. The lakes were formed while the area was glaciated.

The Kurtna Landscape Protection Area was established in (1987) 2005 to preserve region ecology. Total 2820 ha are under protection.

The composition of the lake waters has changed due to the district's proximity to the oil shale industry in Estonia.

== Lakes ==
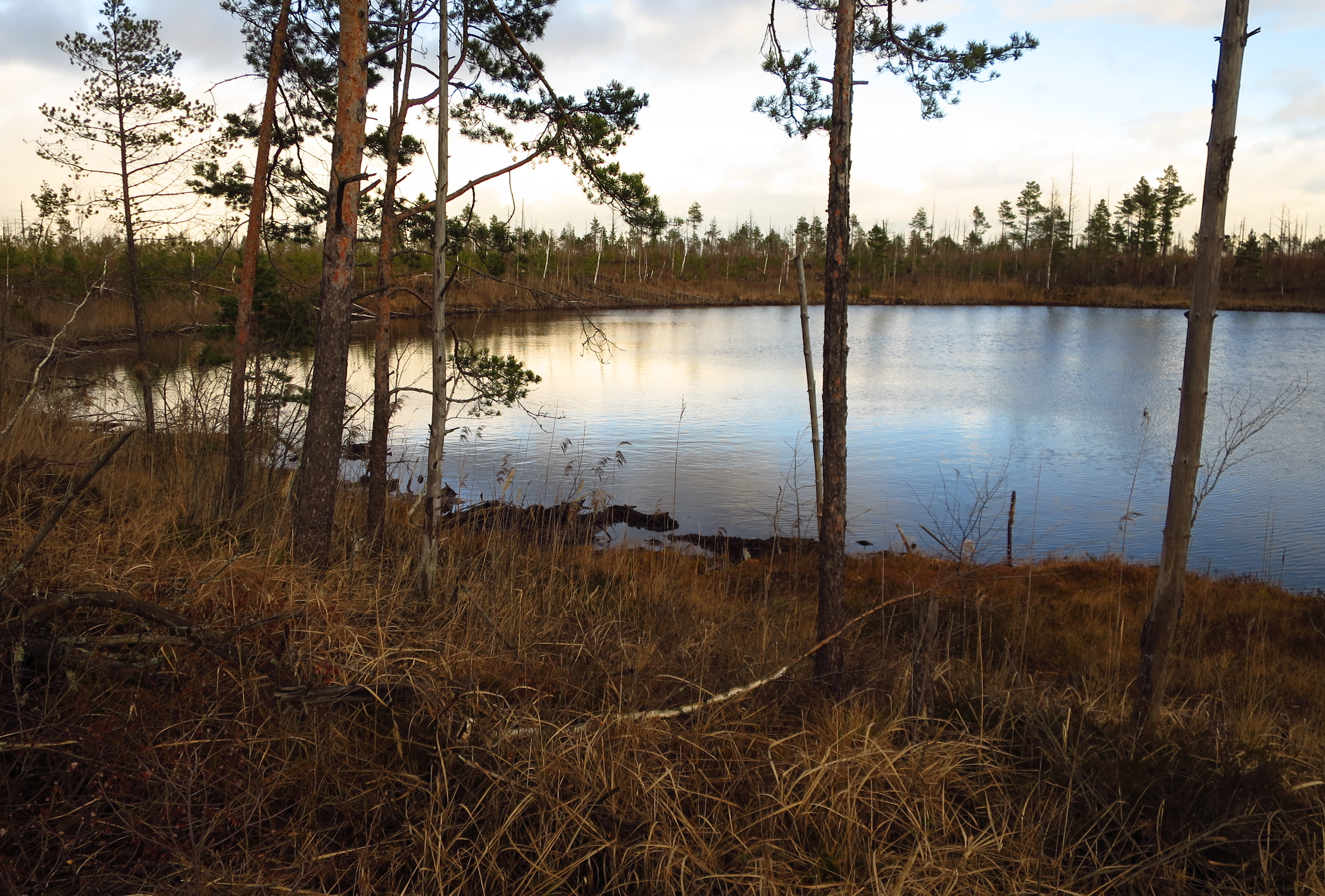
Kulpjärv

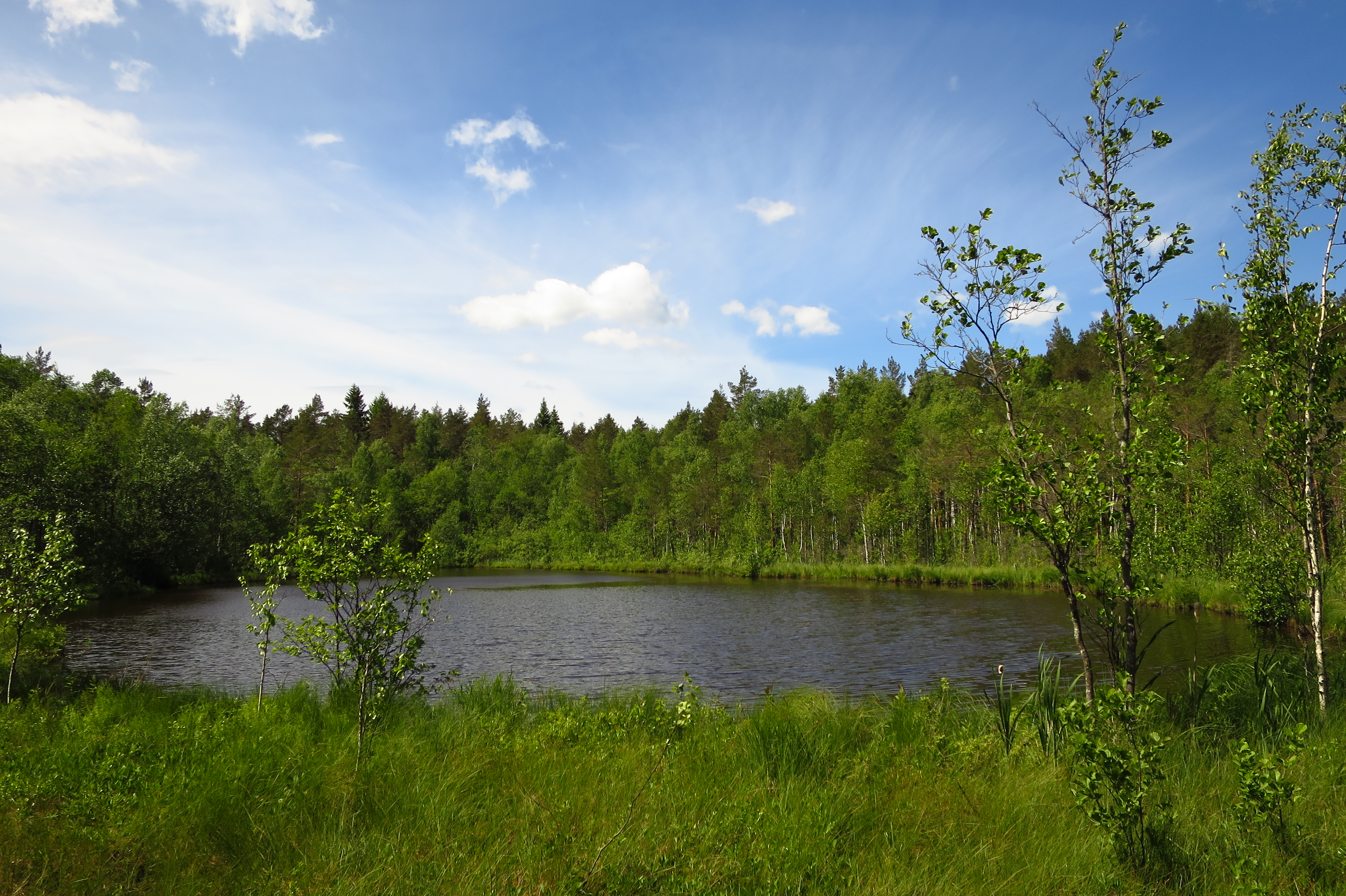
Sisalikujärv

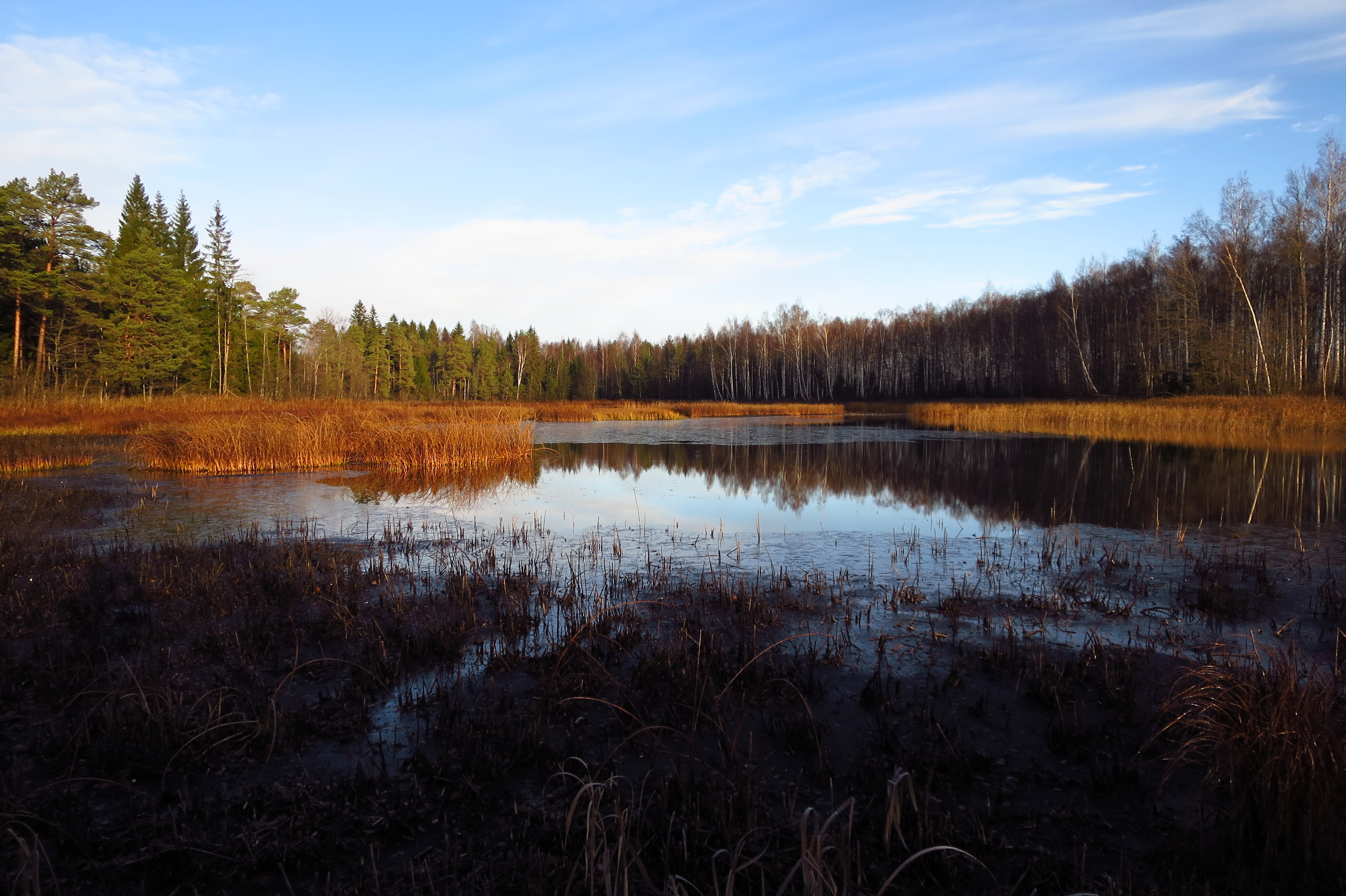
Kastjärv

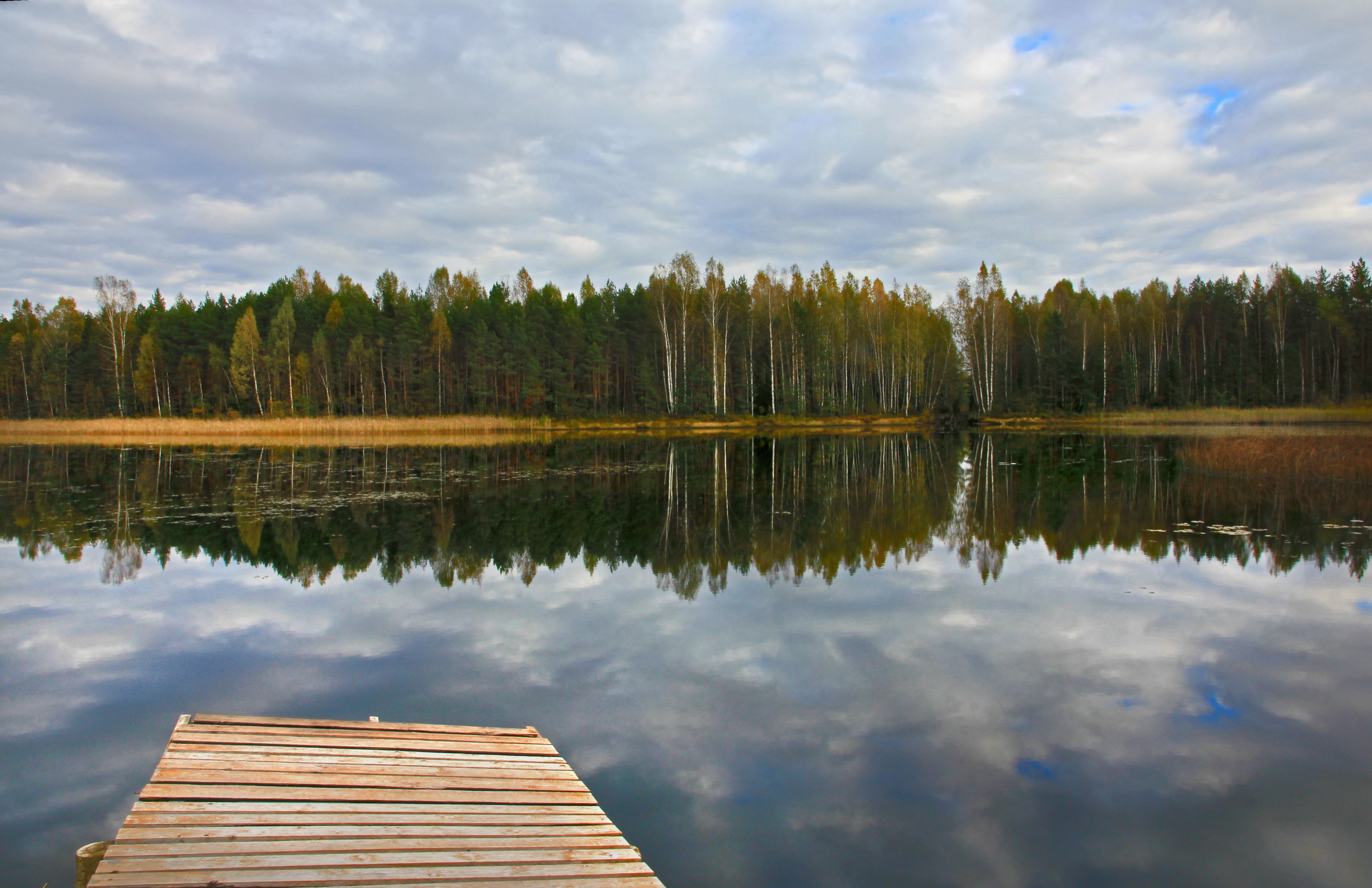
Niinsaare

1. Konsu Lake
2. Kurtna Väike Linajärv
3. Suur Linajärv
4. Räätsma Lake
5. Saarejärv
6. Sisalikujärv
7. Nõmmejärv
8. Niinsaare
9. Väike-Niinsaare Lake
10. Mustjärv
11. Haugjärv
12. Punane Lake
13. Särgjärv
14. Ahvenjärv
15. Peen-Kirjakjärv
16. Kirjakjärv
17. Valgejärv
18. Jaala Lake
19. Must-Jaala Lake
20. Martiska Lake
21. Kuradijärv
22. Ahnejärv
23. Suurjärv
24. Väike Laugasjärv
25. Piirakajärv
26. Vasavere Lake
27. Aknajärv
28. Virtsiku Lake
29. Allikjärv
30. Nootjärv
31. Kihljärv
32. Mätasjärv
33. Konnajärv
34. Vasavere Mustjärv
35. Pannjärv
36. Ratasjärv
37. Laukasoo Suurlaugas
38. Lusikajärv
39. Kulpjärv
40. Liivjärv
41. Rääkjärv
42. Kastjärv
