= Sõtke (river) =

River in Estonia

Coordinates: 59.399231°N 27.771772°E

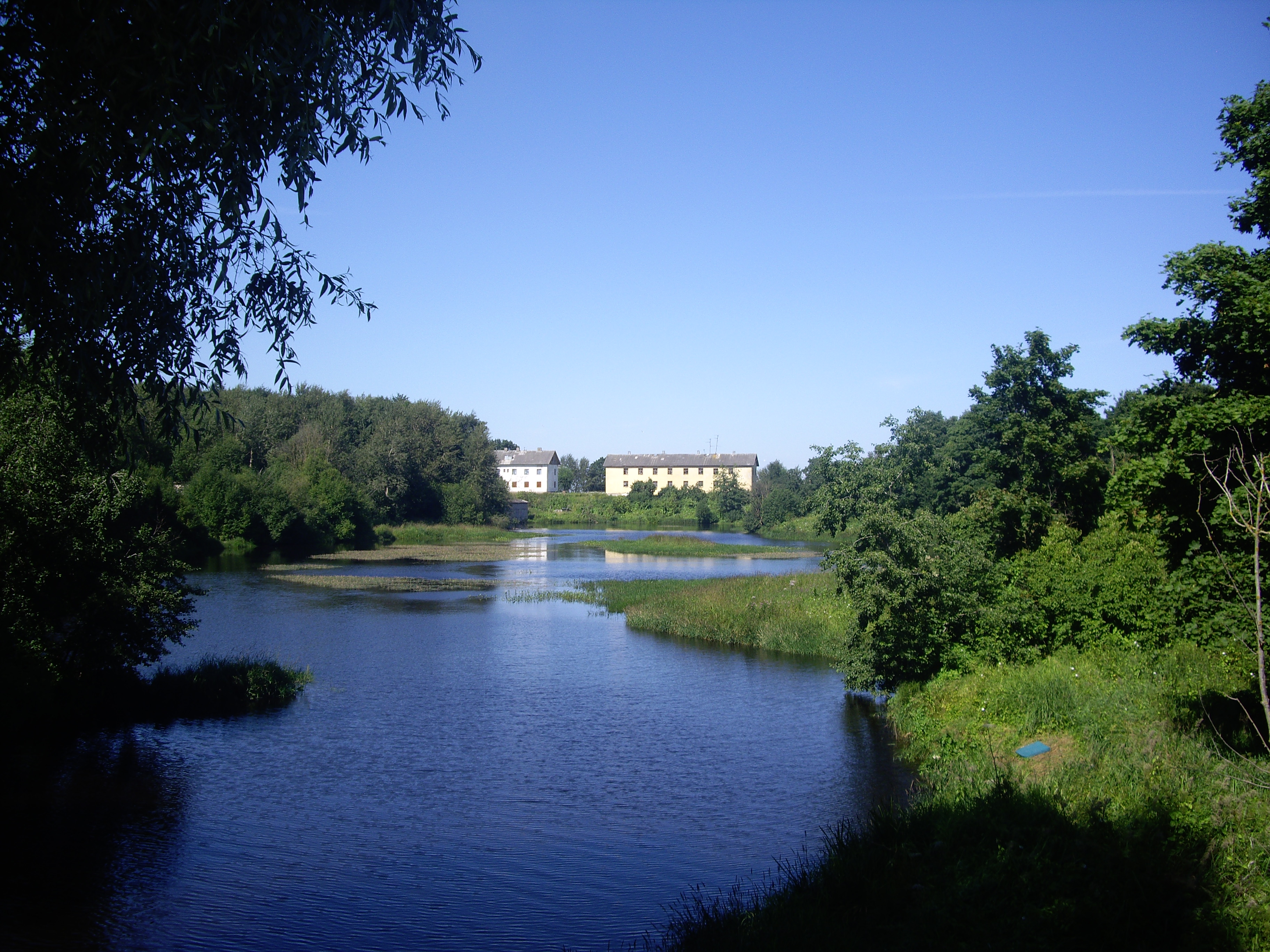
- Reservoir of the Sõtke in Sillamäe

Location
- Country: Estonia

Physical characteristics
- Source
  - location: Kurtna Lake District
- Mouth
  - location: Gulf of Finland
- Length: 24 km (15 mi)
- Basin size: 93.7 km^{2} (36.2 sq mi)

The Sõtke is a 24 km (15 mi) long river in Ida-Viru County, Estonia. Its source is near Isandajärv, which is located in the northern part of the Kurtna Lake District. The Sõtke flows into the Gulf of Finland in the town of Sillamäe. The basin area of the Sõtke is 93.7 km^{2}.
