= Institute of Economics and Management =

Business school in Estonia

Coordinates: 59°27′4.18″N 24°42′47.9″E

Institute of Economics and Management (ECOMEN) (Estonian: Majanduse ja Juhtimise Instituut) was a private university in Estonia from 1993 to 2013.

It was founded in Sillamäe and from 1999 to 2006 it hold the name Sillamäe Institute of Economics and Management.

== See also ==
- List of universities in Estonia
