= Pannjärv =

Lake in Estonia

- Location within Estonia
- Coordinates: 59.2911895°N 27.5522023°E
- Basin countries: Estonia
- Max. length: 200 meters (660 ft)
- Surface area: 2.0 hectares (4.9 acres)
- Shore length^{1}: 530 meters (1,740 ft)
- Surface elevation: 45 meters (148 ft)
- ^{1} Shore length is not a well-defined measure.

Pannjärv (also known as Panijärv or Pannijärv) is a lake in the northeastern Estonia. It is located in the village of Vasavere in Alutaguse Parish, Ida-Viru County, close to the border with Russia.

== Physical description ==
The lake has an area of 2.0 hectares (4.9 acres). It is 200 meters (660 ft) long, and its shoreline measures 530 meters (1,740 ft).

== See also ==
- List of lakes of Estonia
