= Nootjärv =

Lake in Estonia

- Location within Estonia
- Coordinates: 59.26691°N 27.191162°E
- Basin countries: Estonia
- Max. length: 310 meters (1,020 ft)
- Surface area: 5.1 hectares (13 acres)
- Shore length^{1}: 880 meters (2,890 ft)
- Surface elevation: 41.6 meters (136 ft)
- ^{1} Shore length is not a well-defined measure.

Nootjärv is a lake in northeastern Estonia. It is located in the village of Vasavere in Alutaguse Parish, Ida-Viru County, close to the border with Russia and the coast of the Gulf of Finland.

== Physical description ==
The lake has an area of 5.1 hectares (13 acres). It is 310 meters (1,020 ft) long, and its shoreline measures 880 meters (2,890 ft).

== See also ==
- List of lakes of Estonia
