= Sillamäe =

Town in Ida-Viru, Estonia

- Town

- Flag Coat of arms

- Location in Estonia
- Coordinates: 59°23′35″N 27°46′27″E
- Country: Estonia
- County: Ida-Viru County
- First mention: 1502

Government
  - Mayor: Tõnis Kalberg (Centre Party)

Area
  - Total: 12.15 km^{2} (4.69 sq mi)
- Elevation: 18 m (59 ft)

Population (2025)
  - Total: 11,824
  - Rank: 10th
  - Density: 973.2/km^{2} (2,520/sq mi)
- Time zone: UTC+2 (EET)
  - Summer (DST): UTC+3 (EEST)
- Postal code: 40231 to 40233
- Area code: (+372) 033
- ISO 3166 code: EE-735
- Vehicle registration: I
- Website: www.sillamae.ee

Sillamäe (Estonian for 'Bridge Hill'; also known by the Germanised names of Sillamäggi or Sillamägi) is a town in Ida-Viru County in the northeastern part of Estonia, on the southern coast of the Gulf of Finland. It has a population of 11,824 (as of 2025) and covers an area of 12.15 km^{2}. Sillamäe is located at the mouth of the Sõtke River. Its population is predominantly Russian-speaking.

== History ==
The locality of Sillamäggi was first mentioned in writing in 1502 when the area was under the control of the Livonian Order. The bridge across the Sõtke River and a mill in Sillamäggi were documented in 1700.

In the 1800s, Sillamäggi developed into a resort village offering a more tranquil experience than the nearby resort town of Hungerburg. The Russian physiologist Ivan Pavlov owned a dacha in Sillamäggi and vacationed there during summer breaks from 1891 to 1917. Among other famous vacationers of Sillamäggi were the poet Konstantin Balmont (1905), painter Albert Benois (1898 and 1899), physicist Paul Ehrenfest (1908–1912), botanist Andrei Famintsyn (1890s), historian Mikhail Gershenzon (1911–1914), inventor Boris Rosing (1902–1911), and composer Pyotr Ilyich Tchaikovsky (1868).

In the 1920s and 1930s, Sillamäe and the surrounding countryside saw the rise of the oil shale mining industry in the area. From 1927 to 1929, the Swedish company Estländska Oljeskifferkonsortiet built an oil shale processing plant and a power station at the location of Türsamäe Manor, on the western side of Sillamäe. This plant reached a total capacity of 500 tonnes per day in the mid-1930s. A small harbour was constructed in Sillamäe to support the plant's activities, but it was destroyed during World War II.

During the Nazi occupation, several concentration camps were established in the vicinity of Sillamäe to employ slave laborers in the local mines. Upon withdrawal from Sillamäe in 1944, German forces sabotaged the processing plant. The German defensive positions on the hills east of Sillamäe, known as Sinimäed, formed the Tannenberg Line during the Battle of Narva.

In 1946–1948, the former oil shale processing plant in Sillamäe was rebuilt by the Soviets to extract uranium oxide from the locally mined graptolitic argillite ore (a type of oil shale). During that time, many war prisoners were employed at the construction and mining activities in Sillamäe. The uranium extraction process at the Sillamäe plant was developed in collaboration with a nearby Narva pilot plant (known as Cloth Dyeing Factory) and produced mainly a 40% uranium concentrate at the onset of plant production. The local mining operations continued until 1952. In the following years, richer uranium ores were imported to the Sillamäe plant from various locations of Central Asia and the Eastern Bloc, mainly from mines in Czechoslovakia, East Germany, Hungary, Poland and Romania including the Bihor mine operated by Sovromcuarţ (one of the SovRoms operated jointly by the Soviet Union and Romania). In 1970, the plant started to process loparite ore from the Kola Peninsula producing tantalum and niobium chemicals. Later, it also started to extract rare earth metal oxides. In 1982, the plant began the production of reactor-grade enriched uranium (2–4.4% ^{235}U) in form of UO_{2}. Uranium production at Sillamäe continued to supply nuclear materials for the Soviet nuclear power plants and weapon facilities until 1989. From 1950 to 1989, the plant produced about 98,681 tonnes of uranium (mostly as U_{3}O_{8}) and 1354.7 tonnes of enriched uranium.

During its operations, the Sillamäe plant dumped the processing wastes into a tailing pond at the north-western part of Sillamäe near the Baltic Sea shoreline. By the 1990s, the pond presented a serious ecological hazard due to leaching of radioactive and other harmful particulates and dissolved materials into the Baltic Sea. In the 2000s, measures were undertaken to secure the containment of the wastes at Sillamäe.

In 1957, Sillamäe officially gained town status. By that time, it had already grown beyond the historical boundaries of Sillamäggi and included several neighboring settlements, such as Kannuka and Türsamäe. During the Soviet regime in Estonia, Sillamäe remained a closed town due to the secrecy and security measures related to the uranium production activities at the local plant and was not administratively part of the Kohtla-Järve district that surrounded it.

== Demographics ==
Ethnic composition 1959-2021
Ethnicity	1959		1970		1979		1989		2000		2011		2021	
Ethnicity	number	%	number	%	number	%	number	%	number	%	number	%	number	%
Estonians	174	2.12	659	4.88	689	4.26	656	3.19	719	4.18	685	4.81	690	5.55
Russians	-	-	11566	85.6	13850	85.7	17770	86.4	14756	85.8	12469	87.5	10774	86.6
Ukrainians	-	-	390	2.89	482	2.98	698	3.39	517	3.01	354	2.48	329	2.64
Belarusians	-	-	390	2.89	531	3.29	653	3.18	479	2.79	305	2.14	231	1.86
Finns	-	-	155	1.15	185	1.15	213	1.04	185	1.08	114	0.80	80	0.64
Jews	-	-	20	0.15	16	0.10	14	0.07	16	0.09	7	0.05	6	0.05
Latvians	-	-	15	0.11	16	0.10	22	0.11	19	0.11	13	0.09	17	0.14
Germans	-	-	-	-	29	0.18	40	0.19	48	0.28	33	0.23	37	0.30
Tatars	-	-	-	-	63	0.39	102	0.50	64	0.37	48	0.34	54	0.43
Poles	-	-	-	-	30	0.19	30	0.15	28	0.16	19	0.13	16	0.13
Lithuanians	-	-	26	0.19	32	0.20	32	0.16	26	0.15	17	0.12	14	0.11
unknown	0	0.00	0	0.00	0	0.00	0	0.00	135	0.78	26	0.18	18	0.14
other	8036	97.9	284	2.10	234	1.45	331	1.61	207	1.20	162	1.14	173	1.39
Total	8210	100	13505	100	16157	100	20561	100	17199	100	14252	100	12439	100

Religion in Sillamäe (2021)
1. Unaffiliated (53.2%)
2. Orthodox (42.4%)
3. Lutheran (0.90%)
4. Others Christians (0.70%)
5. Others Religions (2.90%)
6. 0.00%

== Economy ==
After uranium processing ceased in 1989 and Estonia regained independence in 1991, industrial activity at Sillamäe experienced significant decline throughout the 1990s resulting in a high unemployment rate among the local population. The Sillamäe plant was privatized in 1997 to form AS Silmet and continues to produce rare metal and rare earth metal products. It remains the top world producer of niobium and tantalum products including hydroxides, oxides, various grades of metal, metal hydrides, metal powders and NbNi alloy. Among rare earth element products are lanthanum, cerium, praseodymium, neodymium and samarium-europium-gadolinium carbonates, oxides, metals, chloride and nitrate solutions.

On 4 April 2011, the American rare earth metal producer Molycorp announced its acquisition of a 90% stake in AS Silmet. The deal was valued at $89 million at the time. The company was renamed AS Silmet-Molycorp.

In 2005, a deep-sea port (SILPORT) with facilities able to handle dry bulk, liquid fertilizers and oil was opened in Sillamäe. A regular ferry service between Sillamäe and Kotka, Finland was inaugurated in 2006, but was forced to shut down in 2007 due to a low load factor. However, the cargo operations continue to show a steady growth. In 2011, the Sillamäe port reached 4.9 million metric tonnes in cargo traffic taking fifth place among the largest ports in the Baltic states after Tallinn, Riga, Klaipeda and Ventspils.

There are several seaside resorts located in the vicinity of Sillamäe (Toila and Narva-Jõesuu) that were especially popular during the Soviet era.

Population:
1940: 2,642
1965: 9,838
1994: 20,104
2004: 16,806
2025: 11,824

Ethnicity (2000):
Russians: 85.8%
Estonians: 4.2%
Ukrainians: 3.0%
Belarusians: 2.8%
Finns: 1.0%
Others: 3.2%

== Gallery ==
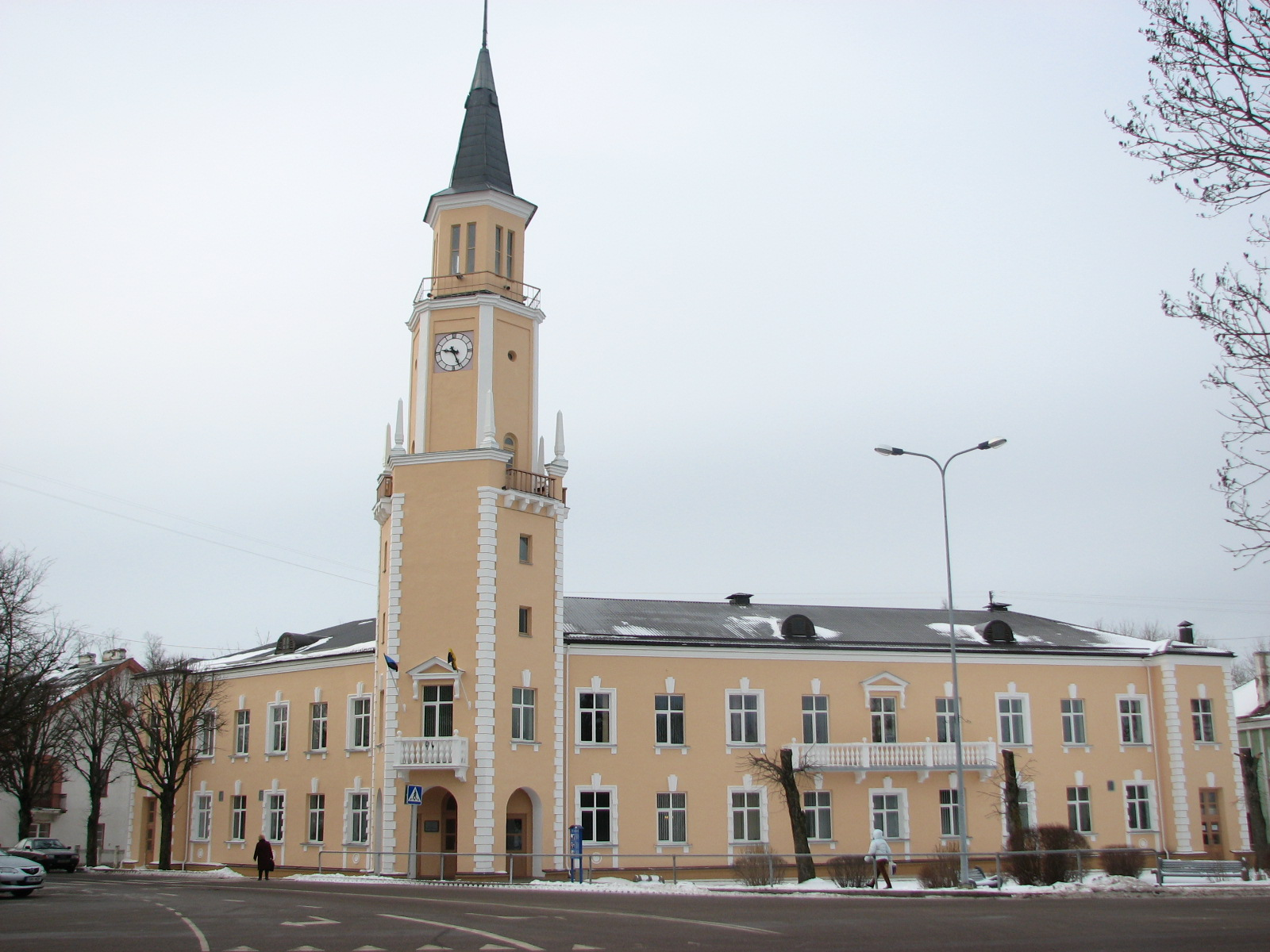
Town hall of Sillamäe

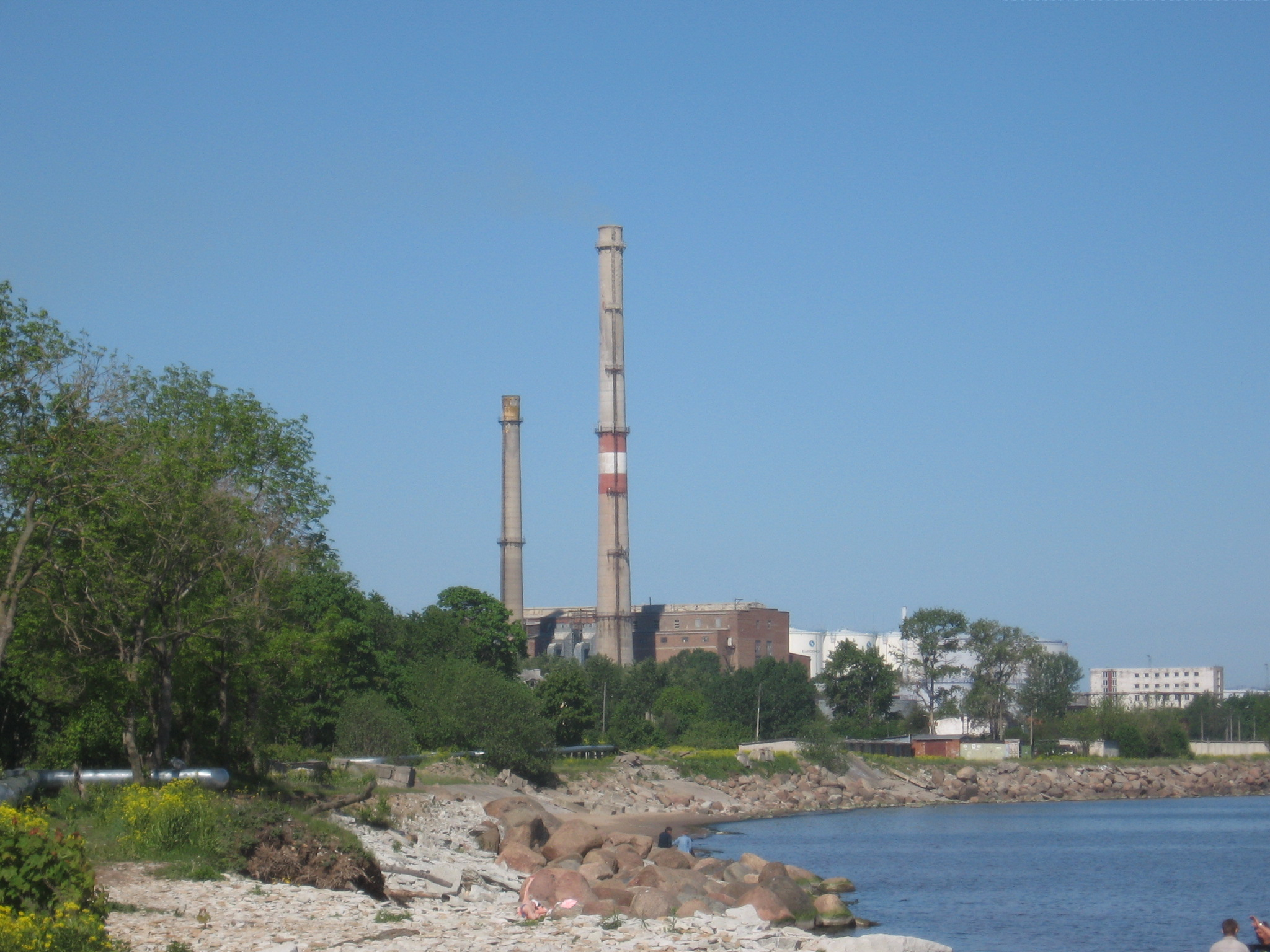
Sillamäe thermal power station

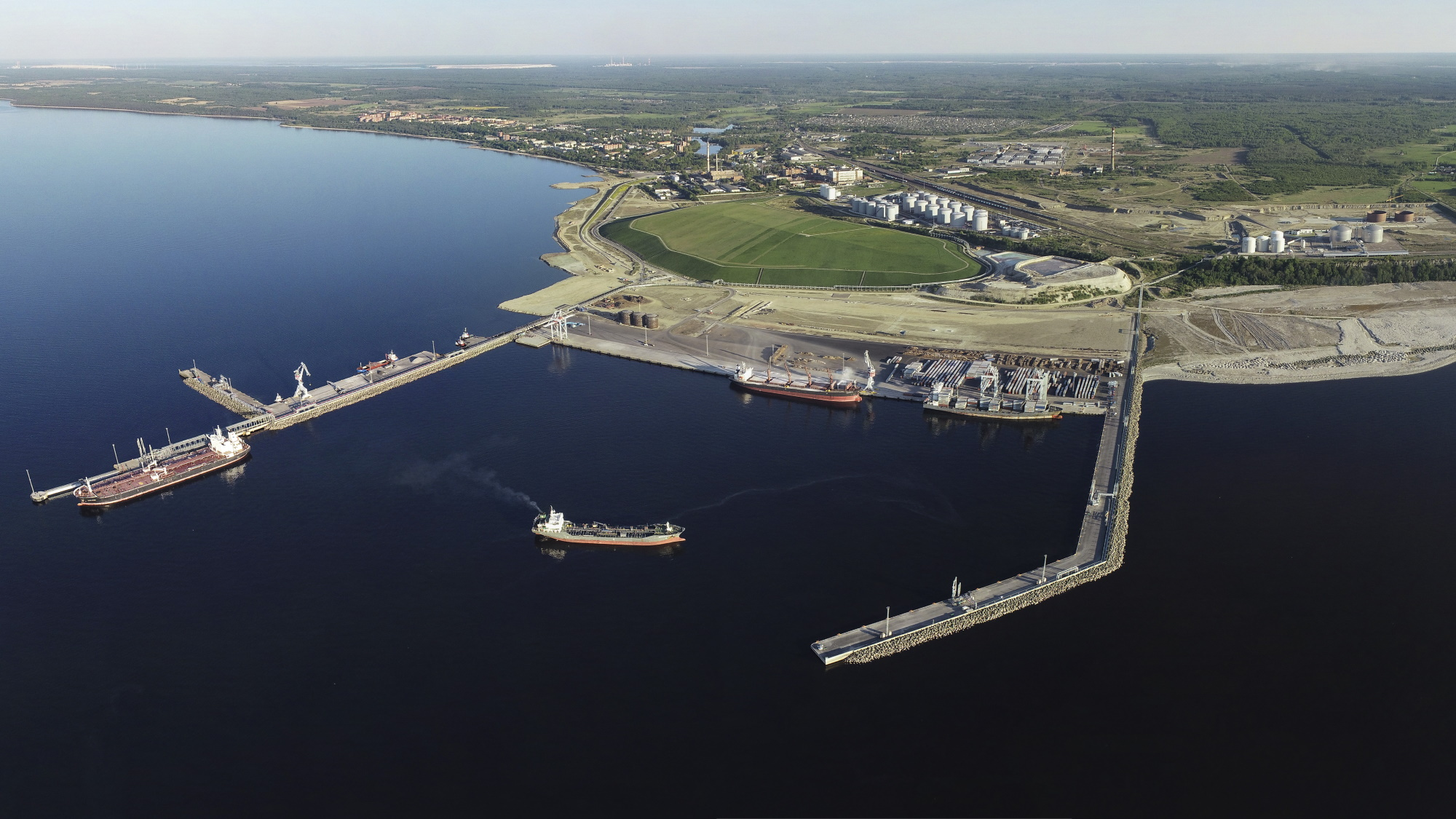
Port of Sillamäe

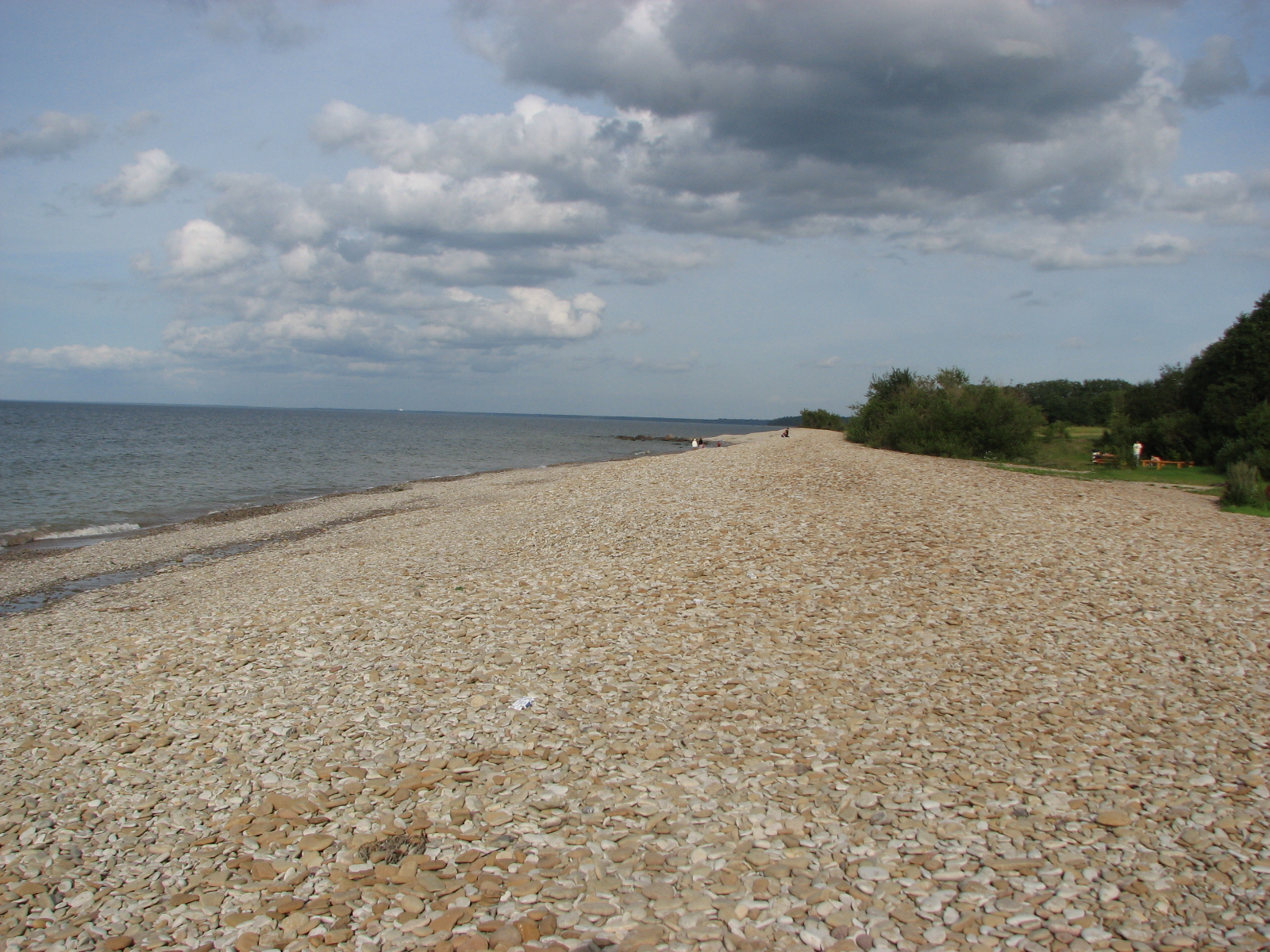
Sillamäe beach

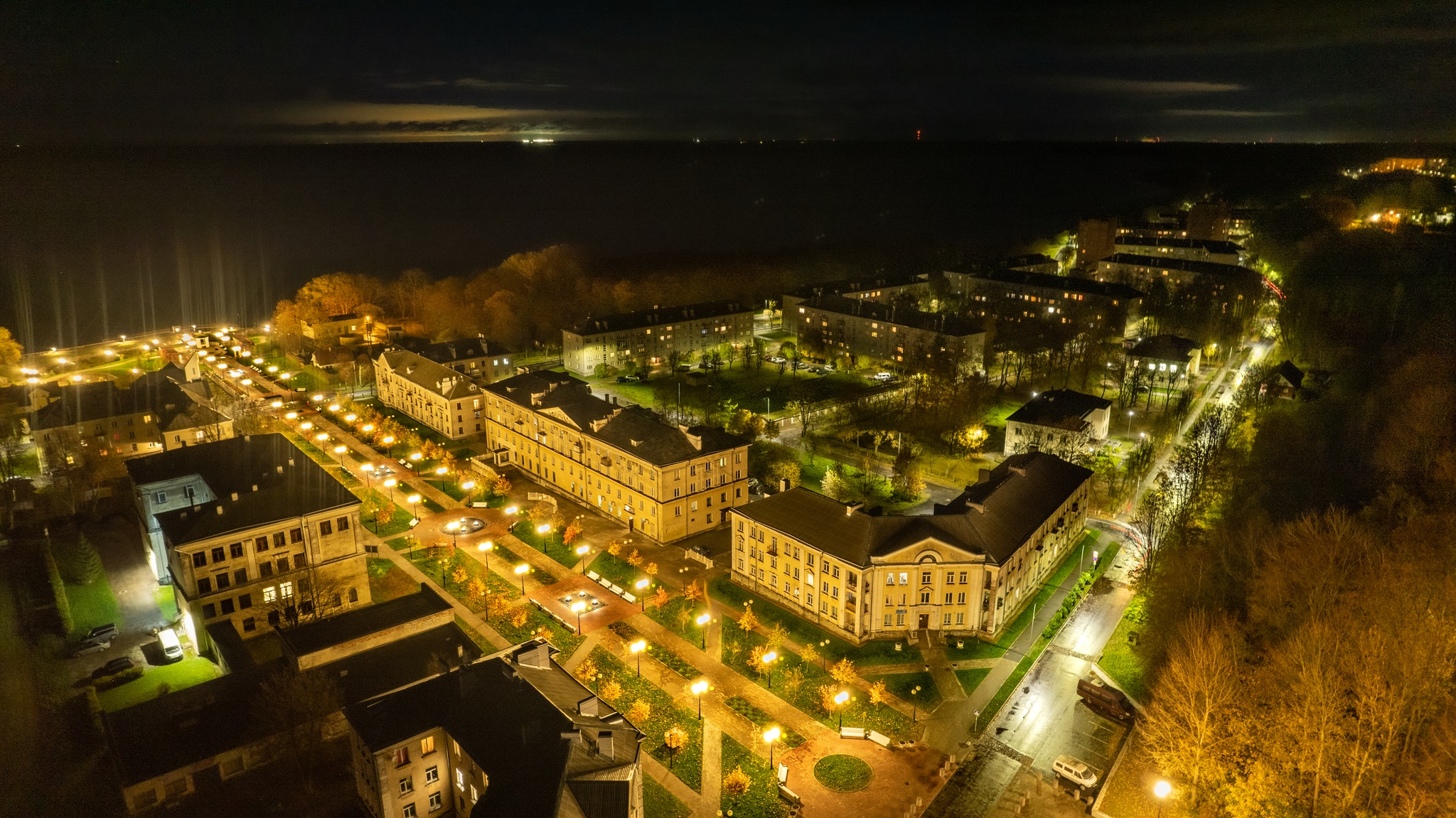
Sillamäe at night

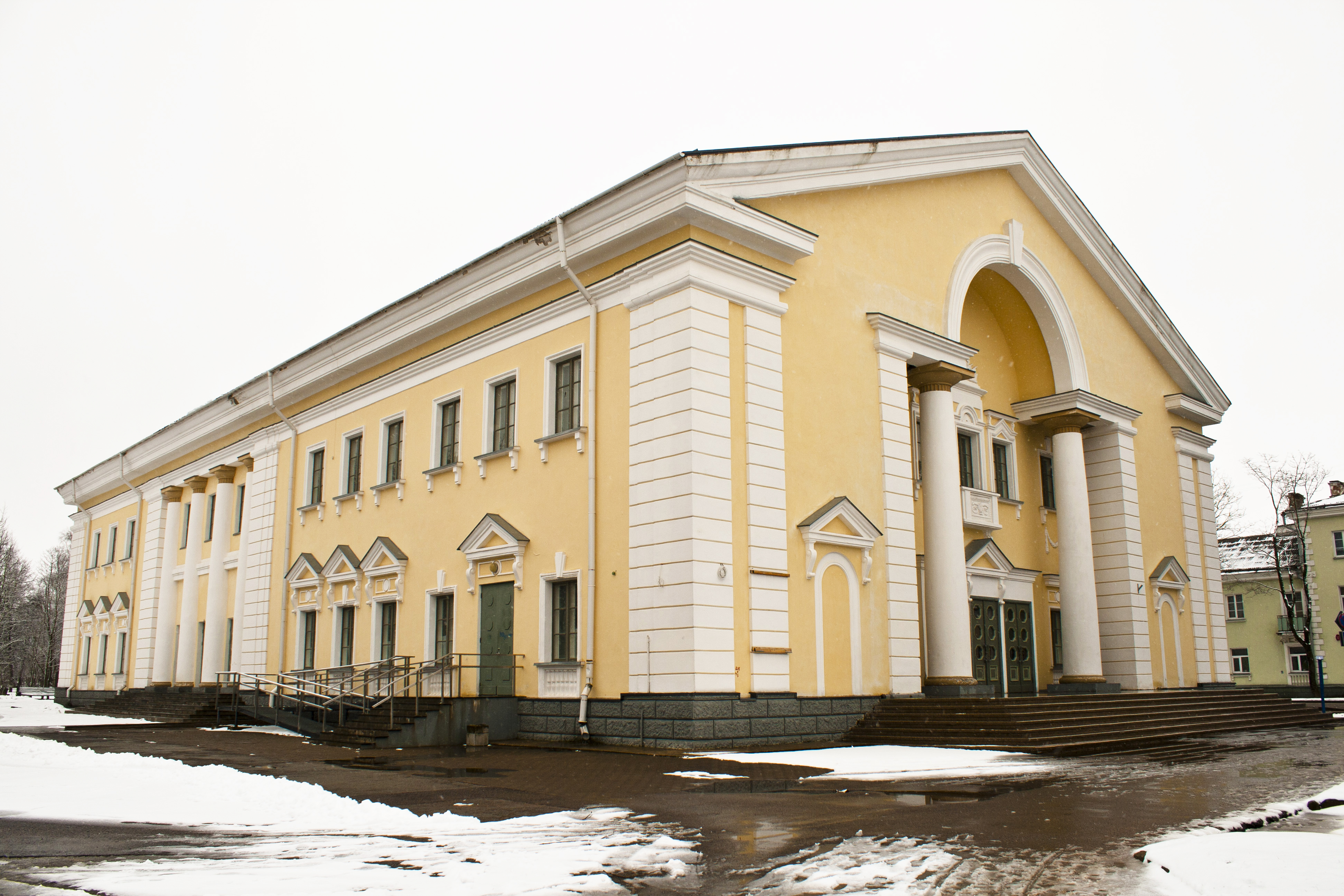
Sillamäe cultural centre

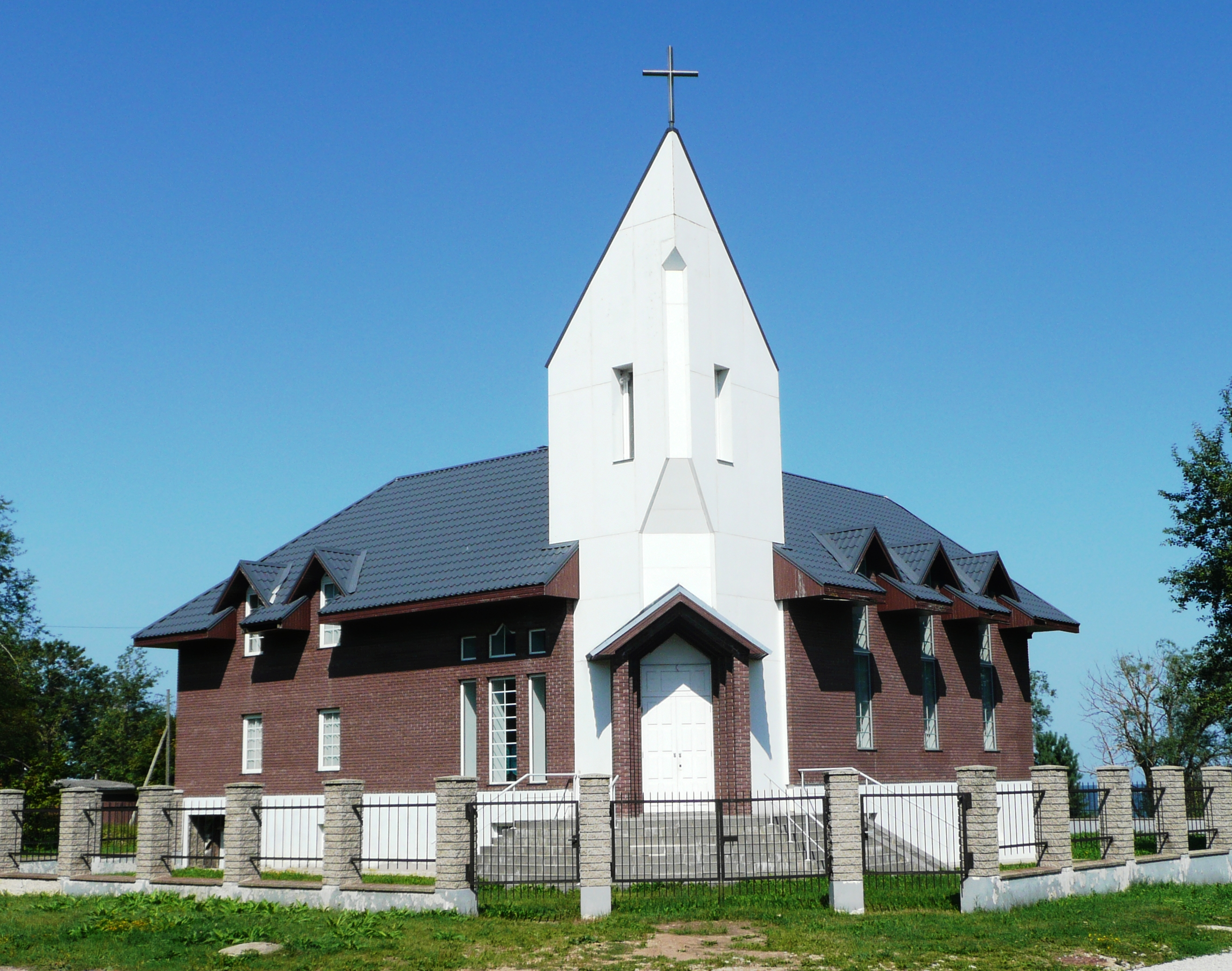
Sts. George and Adalbert Catholic Church

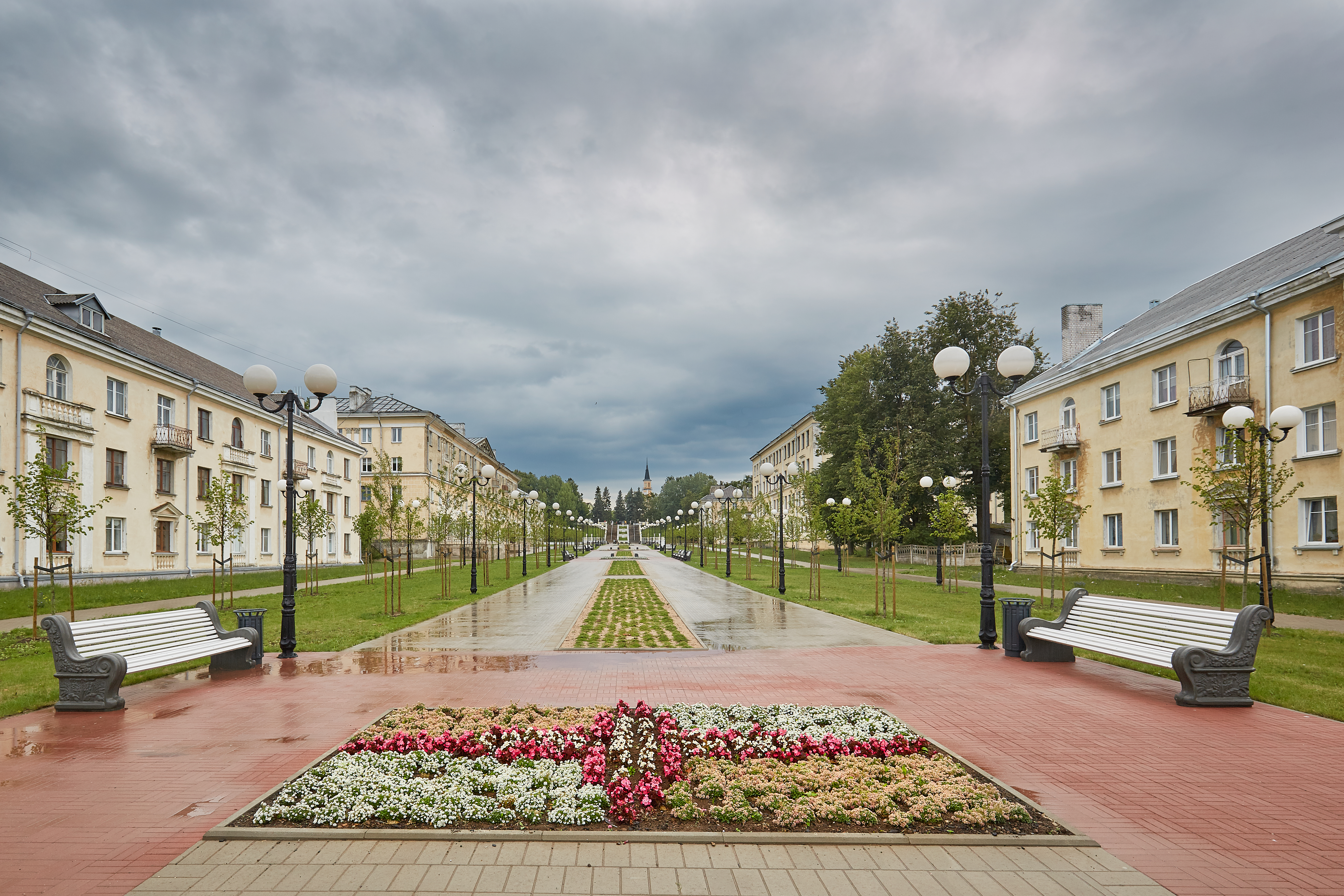
Sillamäe Mere puiestee

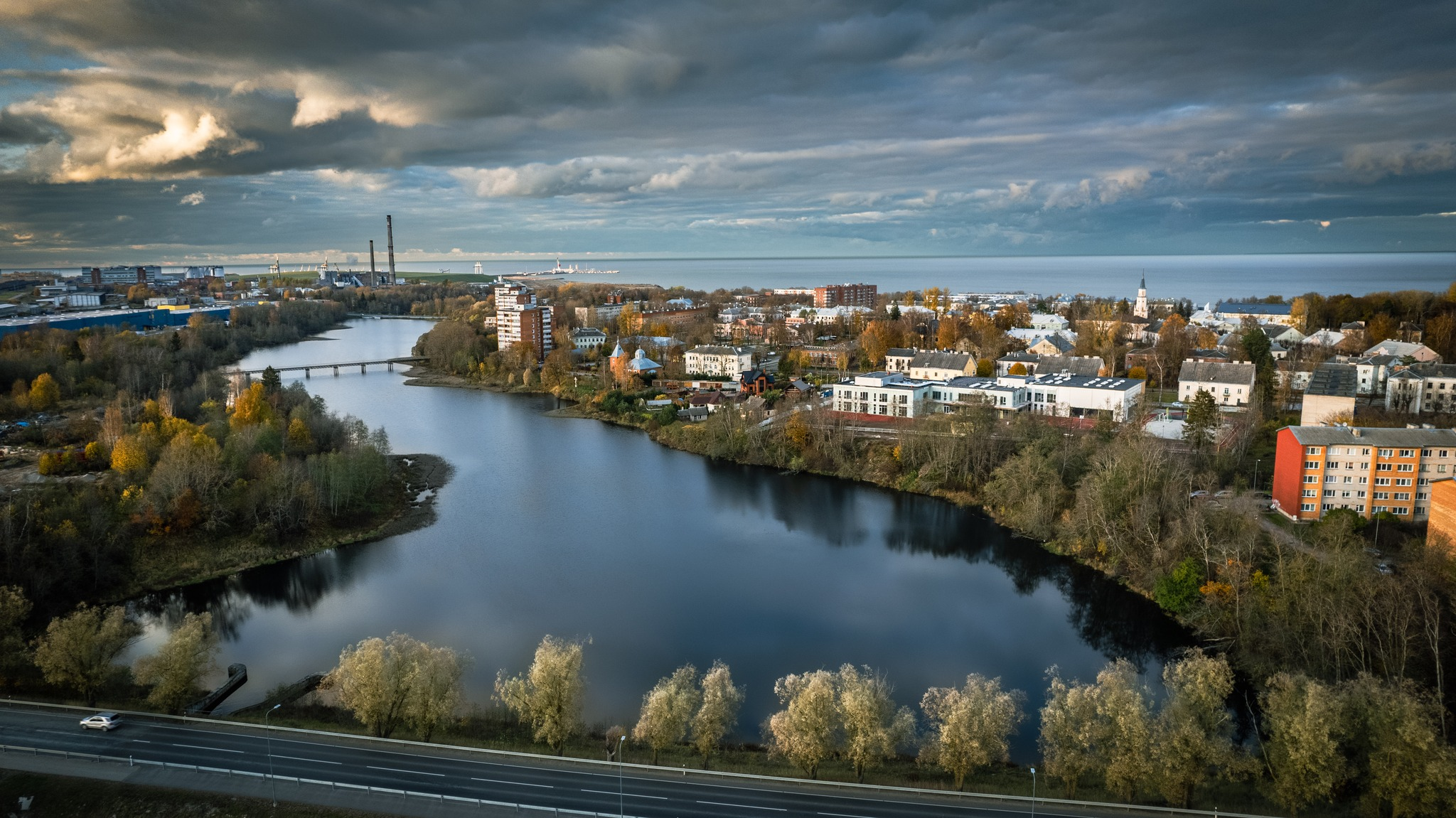
Sillamäe next to the Sõtke river

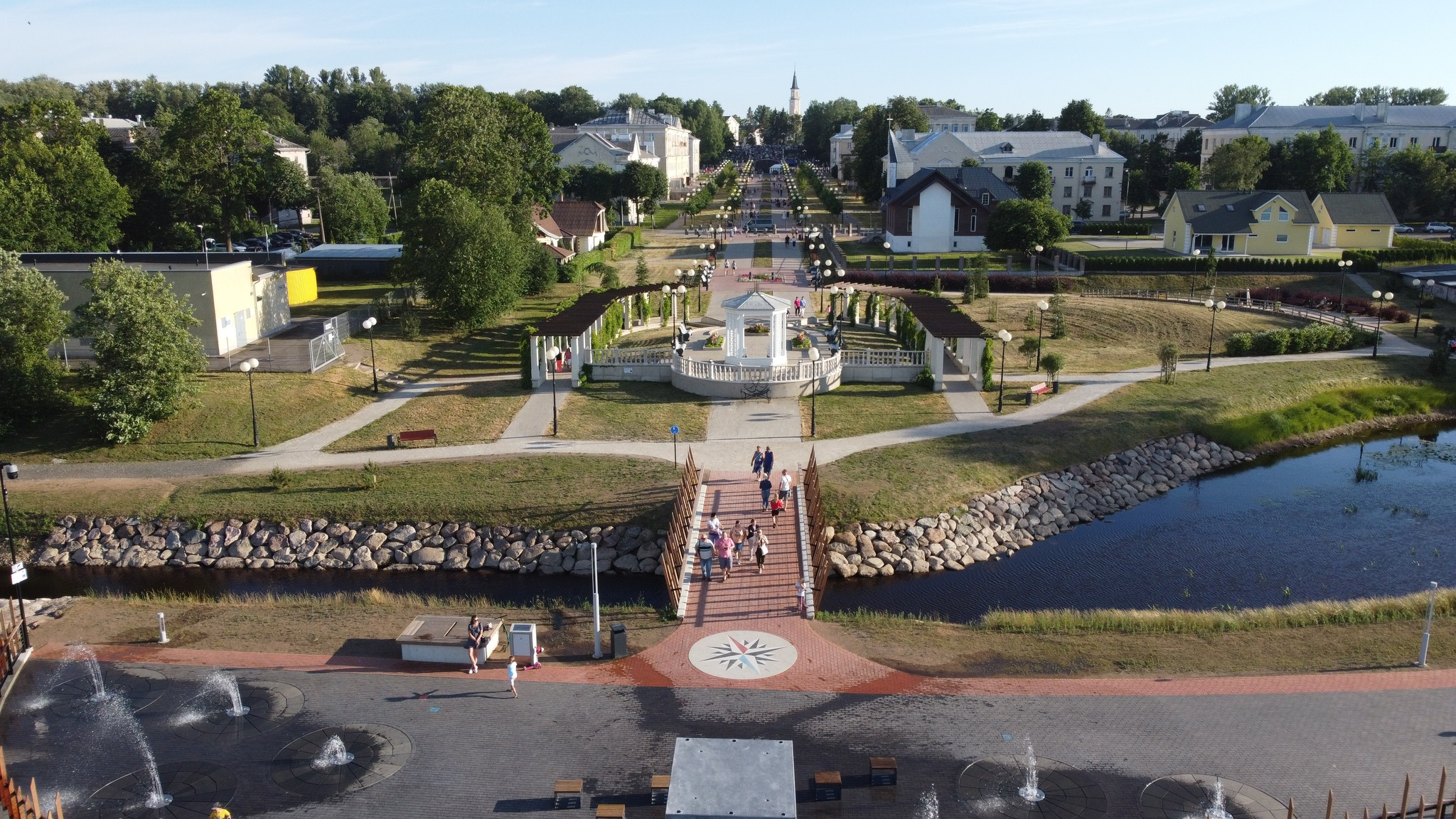
Sillamäe Mere puiestee

Peaceful Atom monument in Sillamae

== Notable people ==
- Anna Iljuštšenko (Born 1985), Estonian high jumper who represented Estonia in the 2008 and 2012 summer Olympics who was born in Sillamäe
- Eneli Jefimova (Born 2006), Estonian Swimmer who participated in the 2020 and 2024 summer Olympics

== See also ==
- Beta-M – Radioisotope thermoelectric generator, made at Sillamäe
- Eestimaa Õlikonsortsium
- Institute of Economics and Management
