= Rääkjärv =

Lake in Estonia

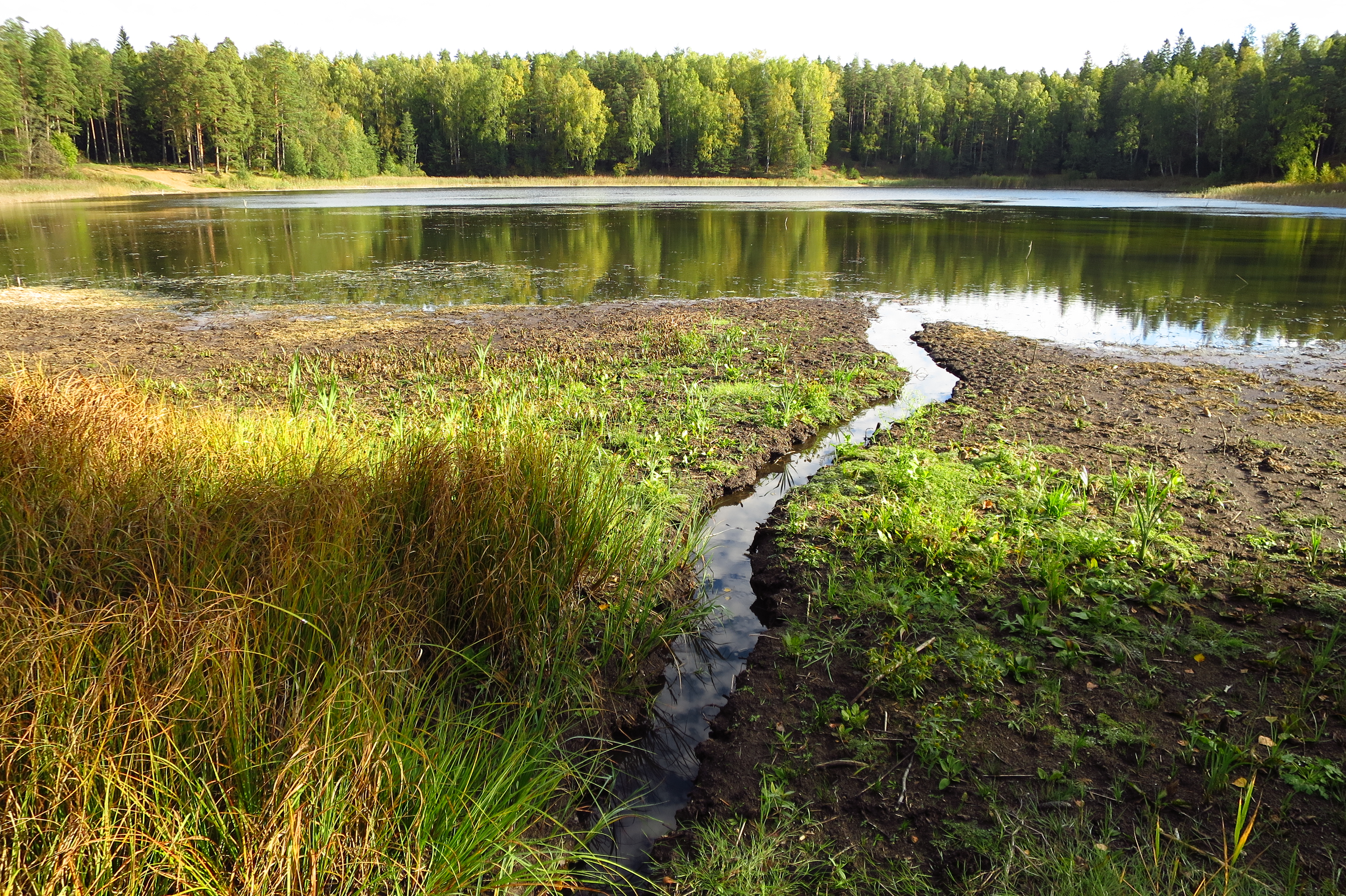

- Location within Estonia
- Coordinates: 59°18′N 27°33′E
- Basin countries: Estonia
- Max. length: 320 meters (1,050 ft)
- Surface area: 5.0 hectares (12 acres)
- Average depth: 2.3 meters (7 ft 7 in)
- Max. depth: 4.8 meters (16 ft)
- Water volume: 115,000 cubic meters (4,100,000 cu ft)
- Shore length^{1}: 900 meters (3,000 ft)
- Surface elevation: 43.4 meters (142 ft)
- ^{1} Shore length is not a well-defined measure.

Rääkjärv is a lake in Estonia. It is located in the village of Vasavere in Alutaguse Parish, Ida-Viru County.

== Physical description ==
The lake has an area of 5.0 hectares (12 acres). The lake has an average depth of 2.3 meters (7 ft 7 in) and a maximum depth of 4.8 meters (16 ft). It is 320 meters (1,050 ft) long, and its shoreline measures 900 meters (3,000 ft). It has a volume of 115,000 cubic meters (4,100,000 cu ft).

== See also ==
- List of lakes of Estonia
