= Aknajärv =

Lake in Estonia

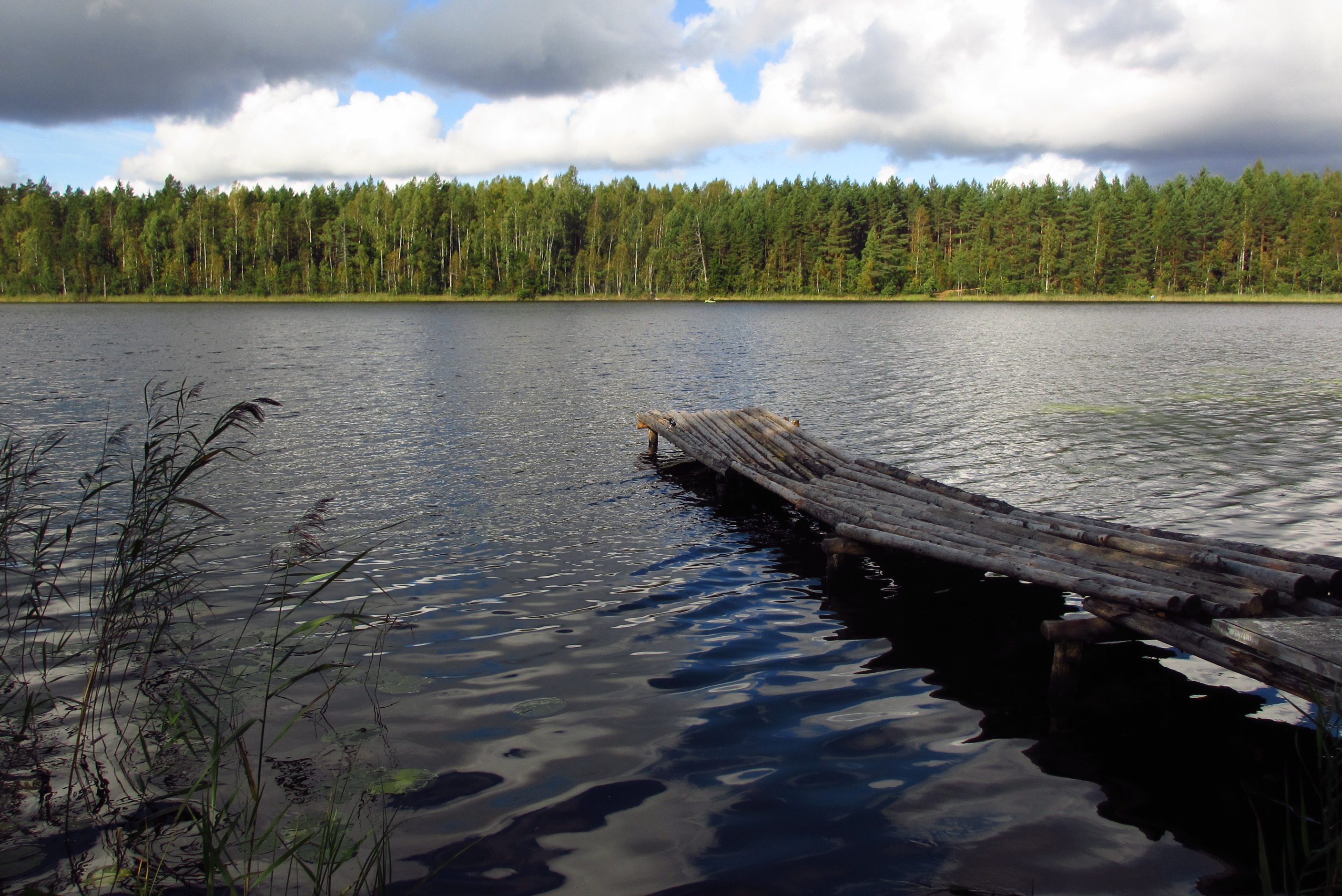

- Location within Estonia
- Coordinates: 59.274°N 27.588°E
- Basin countries: Estonia
- Max. length: 420 meters (1,380 ft)
- Surface area: 8.6 hectares (21 acres)
- Average depth: 3.0 meters (9.8 ft)
- Max. depth: 4.8 meters (16 ft)
- Water volume: 259,000 cubic meters (9,100,000 cu ft)
- Shore length^{1}: 1,160 meters (3,810 ft)
- Surface elevation: 42.7 meters (140 ft)
- ^{1} Shore length is not a well-defined measure.

Aknajärv (also Kurtna Aknajärv) is a lake in Estonia. It is located in the village of Vasavere in Alutaguse Parish, Ida-Viru County.

== Physical description ==
The lake has an area of 8.6 hectares (21 acres). The lake has an average depth of 3.0 meters (9.8 ft) and a maximum depth of 4.8 meters (16 ft). It is 420 meters (1,380 ft) long, and its shoreline measures 1,160 meters (3,810 ft). It has a volume of 259,000 cubic meters (9,100,000 cu ft).

== See also ==
- List of lakes of Estonia
