= Piirakajärv =

Lake in Estonia

- Location within Estonia
- Coordinates: 59.2766829°N 27.5512205°E
- Basin countries: Estonia
- Max. length: 250 meters (820 ft)
- Surface area: 1.3 hectares (3.2 acres)
- Shore length^{1}: 570 meters (1,870 ft)
- Surface elevation: 46.4 meters (152 ft)
- ^{1} Shore length is not a well-defined measure.

Piirakajärv is a lake in northeastern Estonia. It is located in the village of Vasavere in Alutaguse Parish, Ida-Viru County, close to the border with Russia.

== Physical description ==
The lake has an area of 1.3 hectares (3.2 acres). It is 250 meters (820 ft) long, and its shoreline measures 570 meters (1,870 ft).

== See also ==
- List of lakes of Estonia
