= Lake Niinsaare =

Lake in Estonia

- Niinsaare järv (Estonian)
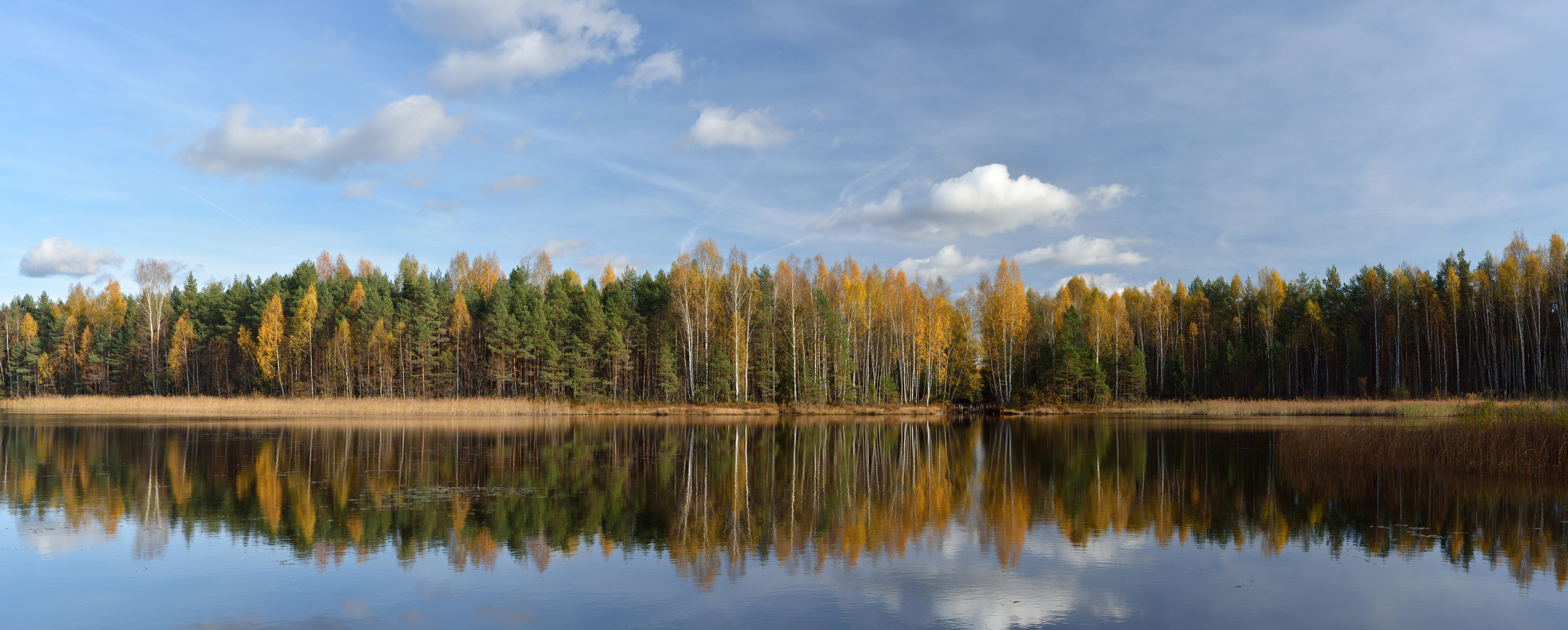

- Location within Estonia
- Coordinates: 59.2500°N 27.5419°E
- Basin countries: Estonia
- Max. length: 470 meters (1,540 ft)
- Surface area: 6.2 hectares (15 acres)
- Average depth: 1.0 meter (3 ft 3 in)
- Max. depth: 2.6 meters (8 ft 6 in)
- Water volume: 61,000 cubic meters (2,200,000 cu ft)
- Shore length^{1}: 1,180 meters (3,870 ft)
- Surface elevation: 45.9 meters (151 ft)
- ^{1} Shore length is not a well-defined measure.

Lake Niinsaare (Estonian: Niinsaare järv) is a lake in Estonia. It is located in the village of Konsu in Alutaguse Parish, Ida-Viru County. On the shore of the lake there is the holiday village of Niinsaare. Lake Niinsaare is located 0.5 kilometers (0.31 mi) northwest of Lake Nõmme (Estonian: Nõmme järv, also known as Kurtna Nõmmejärv).

== Physical description ==
The lake has an area of 6.2 hectares (15 acres). The lake has an average depth of 1.0 meter (3 ft 3 in) and a maximum depth of 2.6 meters (8 ft 6 in). It is 470 meters (1,540 ft) long, and its shoreline measures 1,180 meters (3,870 ft). It has a volume of 61,000 cubic meters (2,200,000 cu ft).

== History ==
Lake Niinsaare used to be a 7.7 ha (19-acre) closed lake. In 1963, a ditch was dug in Lake Mustjärv (also known as Kurtna Mustjärv) from Lake Suurjärv (also known as Kurtna Suurjärv), which caused the water level in Lake Niinsaare to drop significantly. By the summer of 1968, at least 50% of the lake was dry.

== Gallery ==
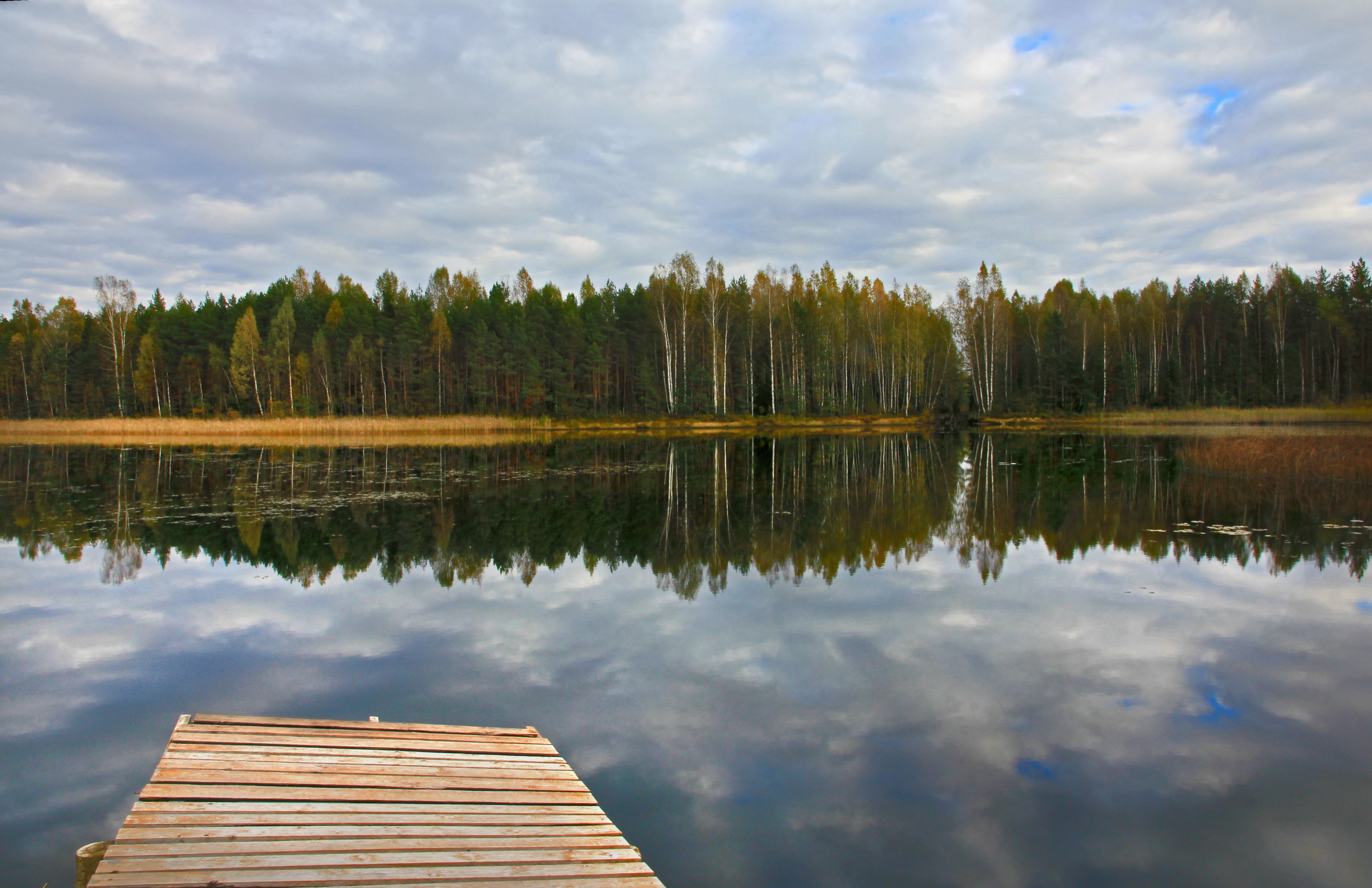
Lake Niinsaare

== See also ==
- List of lakes of Estonia
