= Kastjärv =

Lake in Estonia

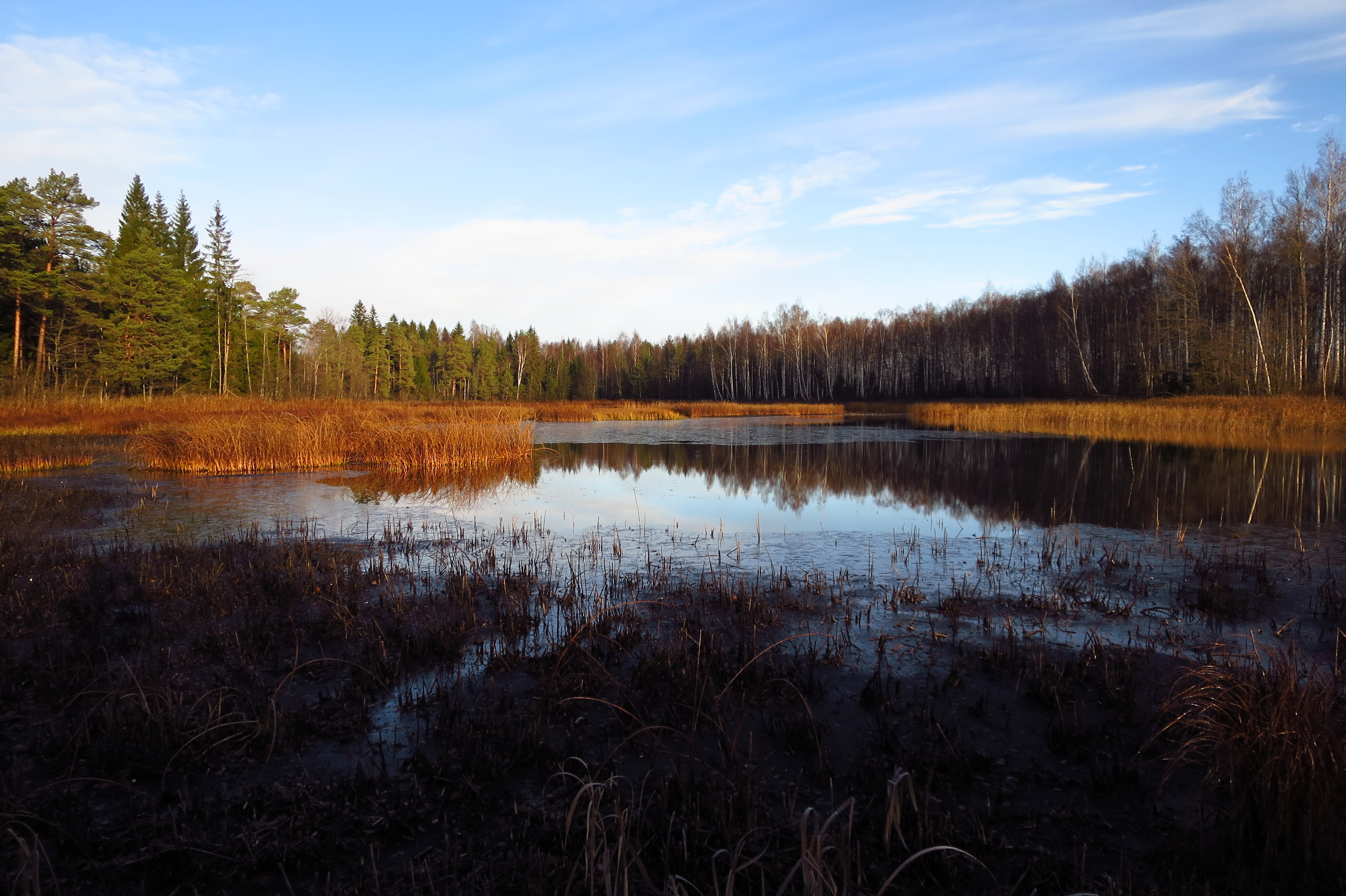

- Location within Estonia
- Coordinates: 59°19′N 27°34′E
- Basin countries: Estonia
- Max. length: 280 meters (920 ft)
- Surface area: 2.5 hectares (6.2 acres)
- Shore length^{1}: 690 meters (2,260 ft)
- Surface elevation: 43.9 meters (144 ft)
- ^{1} Shore length is not a well-defined measure.

Kastjärv (also Kurtna Kastjärv) is a lake in Estonia. It is located in the village of Konju in Toila Parish, Ida-Viru County.

== Physical description ==
The lake has an area of 2.5 hectares (6.2 acres). It is 280 meters (920 ft) long, and its shoreline measures 690 meters (2,260 ft).

== See also ==
- List of lakes of Estonia
