= Vastseliina Parish =

Former municipality of Estonia

Coordinates: 57°43′55″N 27°16′58″E

Vastseliina Parish Vastseliina vald (in Estonian) Vahtsõliina vald (in Võro)
- Former municipality of Estonia
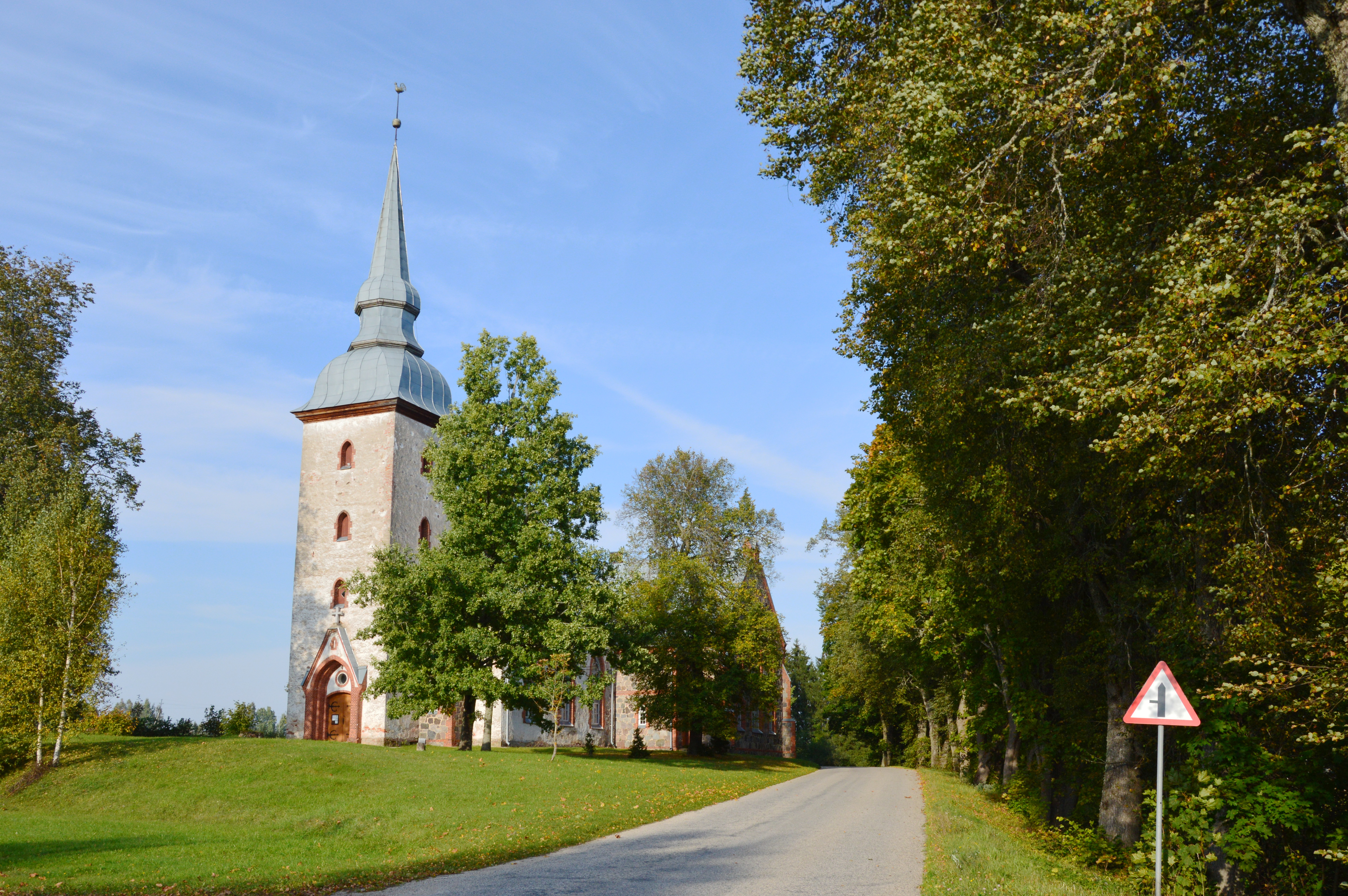
- Vastseliina church

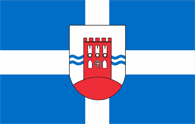
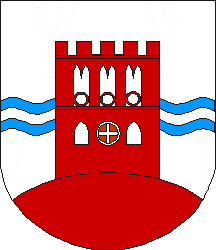
- Flag Coat of arms

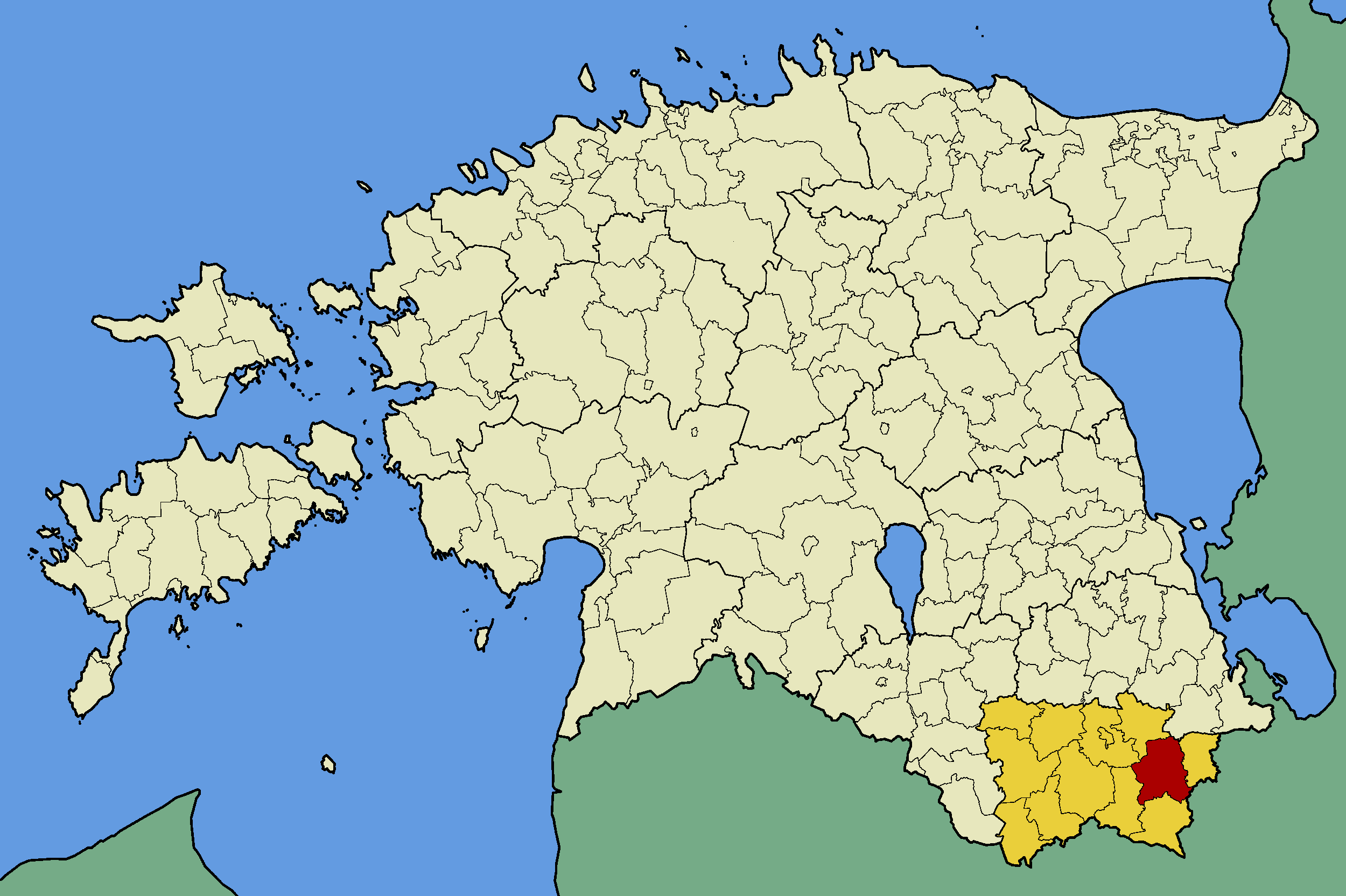
- Vastseliina Parish within Võru County.
- Country: Estonia
- County: Võru County
- Administrative centre: Vastseliina

Area
  - Total: 222.8 km^{2} (86.0 sq mi)

Population (01.01.2008)
  - Total: 2,165
  - Density: 9.717/km^{2} (25.17/sq mi)
- Website: www.vastseliina.ee

Vastseliina Parish (Estonian: Vastseliina vald; Võro: Vahtsõliina vald) was a rural municipality of Estonia, in Võru County. It had a population of 2,165 (2008) and an area of 222.8 km².

== Settlements ==
Small borough

Vastseliina

Villages

Haava - Halla - Heinasoo - Hinniala - Hinsa - Holsta - Illi - Indra - Jeedasküla - Juraski - Kaagu - Käpa - Kapera - Kerepäälse - Kirikumäe - Kõo - Kornitsa - Kõrve - Külaoru - Kündja - Lindora - Loosi - Luhte - Mäe-Kõoküla - Möldri - Mutsu - Ortuma - Paloveere - Pari - Perametsa - Plessi - Puutli - Raadi - Saarde - Savioja - Sutte - Tabina - Tallikeste - Tellaste - Tsolli - Vaarkali - Vana-Saaluse - Vana-Vastseliina - Vatsa - Viitka - Voki

== Notable residents ==
Wrestler and Olympic gold medalist Eduard Pütsep (1898–1960) was born in Vastseliina Parish.
