= The Administrative and Research Centre for the Kurtna Experimental Poultry Farm =

Building in Estonia

Coordinates: 59.2269°N 24.7117°E

The Administrative and Research Centre for the Kurtna Experimental Poultry Farm is one of the major works of Estonian architect Valve Pormeister. Located in Kurtna, Harju County, Estonia and built in 1966, it is the first example of modern architecture in a rural setting and marks the emergence of a new type of modern scientific institution building. It became a model building that was set up as an example for others.

== Style ==
Kurtna center started the period of "cornice architecture" with Finnish influence together with another Valve Pormeisters work Café Tuljak (1964) that lasted for about 10 years.

The main building, that is placed in the landscape with sensitivity and skill, consists of a two-storey two-way corridor system office side and a single-storey connection to the main fan-shaped auditorium hall. The walls are stacked with red bricks with a clean joint, the window blinds are black, crocheted with thin frames. The white cornices highlight the modern horizontality. A lot of elegant details are added to the overall impression, such as the transparency of the house at the entrance, and the lounge area with a fine furnishings in front of a fireplace lowered to the wall, the balancing verticality of the white chimney. Open staircase leads to the second floor. There were scientific rooms, laboratories, library and guest rooms. The main auditorium follows the free flowing space desire introduced by Alvar Aalto. Interior design was made by Vello Asi and Väino Tamm, two leading interior architects of Estonia during that period.

The building together with its surroundings received Soviet Estonia award in 1967.
