= Vello Asi =

Estonian architect (1927–2016)

Vello (Ergav-Vello) Asi (October 18, 1927 – November 20, 2016) was an Estonian interior architect, graphic designer and professor at the Estonian Academy of Arts. Together with Väino Tamm, he has been one of the most important interior architects and representer of modernist interiors in Estonia since the late 1950s.

== Youth and education ==
Asi was born in the village of Vana-Saaluse in the rural municipality of Saaluse, Võrumaa. Both of his parents were from Võrumaa; mother was a farmer and his father was a craftsman.

Interest in arts started already in high school, where he began to design school wallpapers and leaflets. Even though his parents wanted him to continue studies in medicine at the University of Tartu, he decided to study interior architecture at the Estonian Academy of Arts. He graduated from Võru Secondary School No. 1 in 1948 and began studying at ERKI from the same year.

A significant part of his university projects is made up of copying historic furniture drawings. They were mostly made at the Tallinn Art Museum and the Peeter I House Museum in Kadriorg. Interior and furniture design projects were also made for a cabin, a clubhouse, a small apartment. His graduation work was interior design for the hall of Tallinn Polytechnic Institute.

== Work experience ==
From 1954-55, he worked in Tallinn at the national architecture design studio "Estonproject". In the studio Asi`s tasks were primarily drawing architectural details, sections, plans and coloring them.

Subsequently, he worked in the ARS institute from 1956-1964. During those years he completed several museum exhibition designs and he also belonged to the team of interior architects who in 1954-61 made a new interior design for the Estonian Pavilion of the USSR Economic Achievements Exhibition in Moscow. After working in ARS Vello Asi continued creating exhibition designs in Estonia, as well in Moscow, London, Ulaanbaatar. In addition to interior architecture, he also did graphic design and book design, most of which consists of designing Jaan Kross's books and several architecture related books.

His most important works express rationality and tectonic clarity: the Kurtna poultry farm (1967), the offices of the Writers' House in Tallinn (1963), the Tuljak (1967) and Tallinn cafes (1967–69), Karoliina bar (1968; the last three with Väino Tamm), the Radio House studio (1965–77, with H. Oruve), the Viru hotel(1972, with V. Tamme and L. Raudsep, Nõuk, Estonian prize ) and interiors of the Pirita Marine Center Yacht Club and Press Center (1980).

One of his early career`s most important works are the Tallinn Writers' House offices (1963), most significantly the hall with the black ceiling. This was his minimalist and severe reaction to the existing 1950s official style that was more theatrical and festive. Although some have associated the black color with a strong symbolic shadow, Asi has acclaimed he chose the color primarily for practical reasons - to hide holes and dents of the ceiling. However, he was obliged to go to Moscow in order to justify the color choice as the bosses in Tallinn did not dare to give their signature to the project. In addition to the hall, Asi designed in the Writers' House the cabinets and its furniture.

== Collaboration with Väino Tamm ==
An important part of his work was born in collaboration with the interior designer and university schoolmate Väino Tamm. Together they created interior design for Valve Pormeister's architectural masterpieces - the cafe Tuljak and the Kurtna Poultry Farm Testing building. The patron of both buildings was Edgar Tõnurist. He wished that the Tuljak Cafe (1967) would be a self-service brasserie, with a terrace for barbecue and a terrace with fireplaces. The interior of the cafe had a long table along the wall and the room was filled with wood furniture.

Tõnurist was also the patron for the main building of the Kurtna Poultry Farm Testing building, designed by Valve Pormeister. The interior design by Tamm and Asi is based on the architecture and complements it. Modernist interior design is important in the interior: furniture is not designed as a single object but rather as an architectural space element.

In the 1960s, the life of the Old Town of Tallinn became active and new cafes and restaurants were born. Tamm and Asi designed several new cafes in Tallinn`s Old Town: Varietee and cafe Tallinn, wine bar Karoliina, and the restaurant Gloria. The Tallinn cafe (1967-1969) was located on the first floor of Harju Street 6, the Varietee stayed on the second floor. The cafe was filled with the no. 14 Thonet chairs. Tamm and Asi designed tables and a long banquet. The outdoor terrace was in the green area of Harju Street. The Karolina Bar was designed in the former defensive fortress at the Freedom Square.

Tamm and Asi also made together the interiors for Tallinn's new Radio House, the new Pärnu theater, and the Tartu Vanemuine theater. The most important project was the Viru Hotel (Henno Sepmann, Mart Port, 1972). Besides Tamm and Asi, the project was made by Loomet Raudsepp, Taevo Gans and Mait Summatavet. The most important feature of the interior architecture was its perfect harmony with exterior architecture. There was a similar use of materials and simple surfaces both indoors and outdoors. The vestibule was designed by Asi who covered the walls and floors with a dark ceramic tile. The furniture can be characterized by strict geometric volumes that are in perfect harmony with the shape of the room.

The design of the Tallinn Olümpia-Purjespordikeskus (Regati pst. 1) was led by Väino Tamm in 1975-80. The design tasks were divided between the interior architects team (Tamm, Asi, Aulo Padar, Juta Lember, Leo Leesaar). Vello Asi designed the dining room (with Leo Leesaare), the yacht club and the press section.

== List of creations ==
- 1960 Estonian Song Festival design at Tallinn Song Festival Grounds
- 1961 F. R. Kreutzwald Museum interior
- 1963 Tallinn Writers' House hall and offices
- 1964 Composers' House interior
- 1965 Eduard Vilde Museum interior
- 1965-67 Radiohouse studios (acoustics by H. Oruvee, reconstruction)
- 1966 cafe Tuljak interior (with V. Tamm)
- 1967 Kurtna Poultry Farm Testing building interior (with V. Tamm)
- 1968 Karoliina bar interior (with V. Tamm)
- 1967-69 cafe Tallinn interior (with V. Tamm)
- 1969 NSV Liidu majandusnäituse Estonian Pavilion in London at the Soviet Union Economy Exhibition (with E. Reitel, K. Voogre)
- 1972 Viru hotel interior (with V. Tamm, L. Raudsepp, T. Gans, M. Summatavet)
- 1973 Estonia Theatre interior (with V. Tamm)
- 1980 Pirita Marine Center Yacht Club and Press Center interior (with V. Tamm, L. Leesaar, J.Lember ja A.Padar)

== Awards and honors ==
- 1962 Estonian Artists` Association
- 1967 Estonian SSR prize for the Kurtna Poultry Farm Testing building
- 1972 Estonian SSR prize for the Viru hotel (collaboration V. Tamm and L. Raudsep)
- 1977 Estonian SSR-honored architect
- 1990 Estonian Interior Architects` Association
- 2006 Order of the White Star, IV Class Order

== Bibliography ==
- Jagodin, Karen (2007). Tamm ja Asi. Eesti Arhitektuurimuuseum
