= Tallinn Olympic Yachting Centre =

Sports complex in Tallinn

Coordinates: 59°28′02″N 24°49′37″E

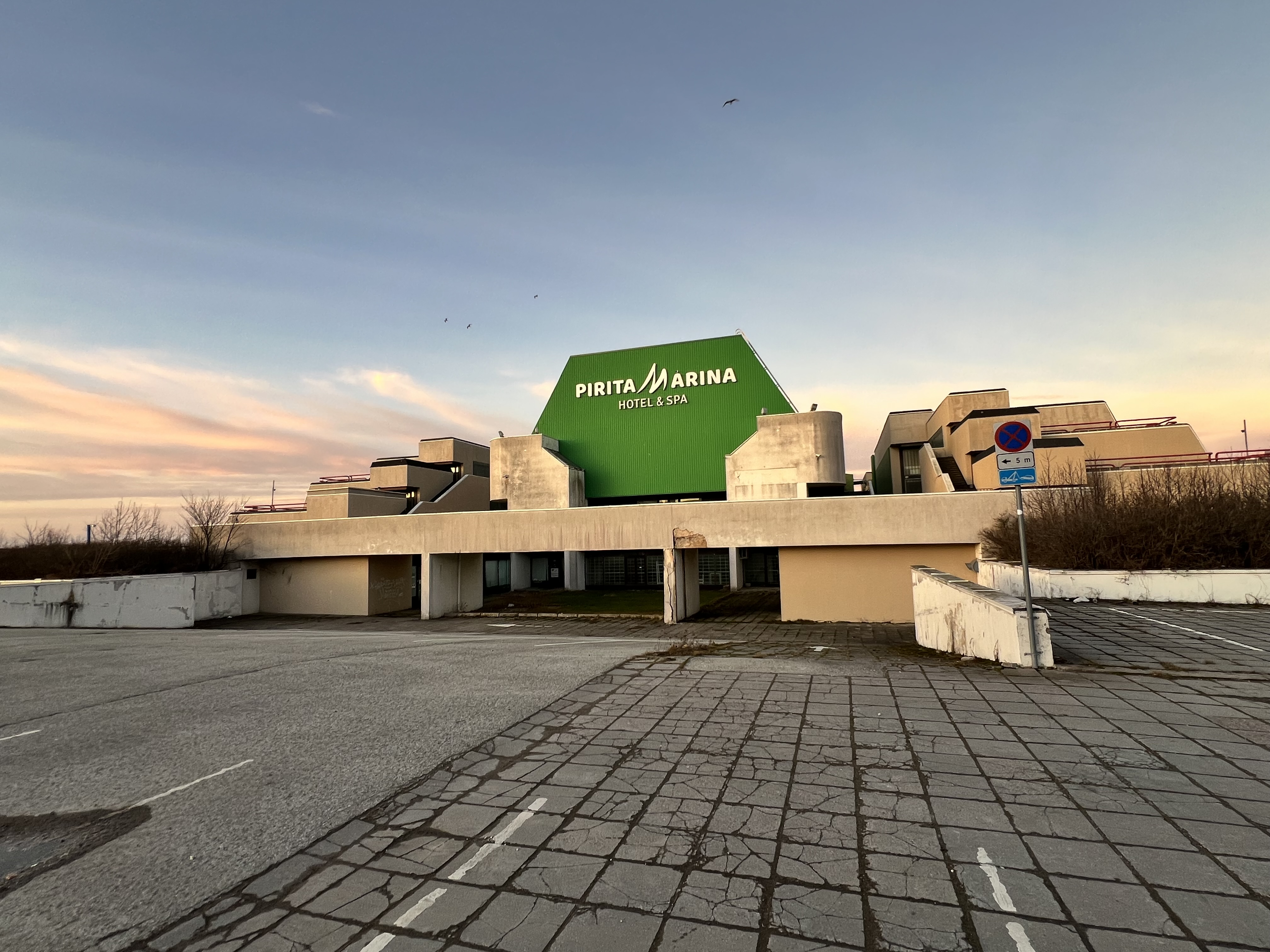
Pirita Marina Hotel at the Tallinn Olympic Yacht Center

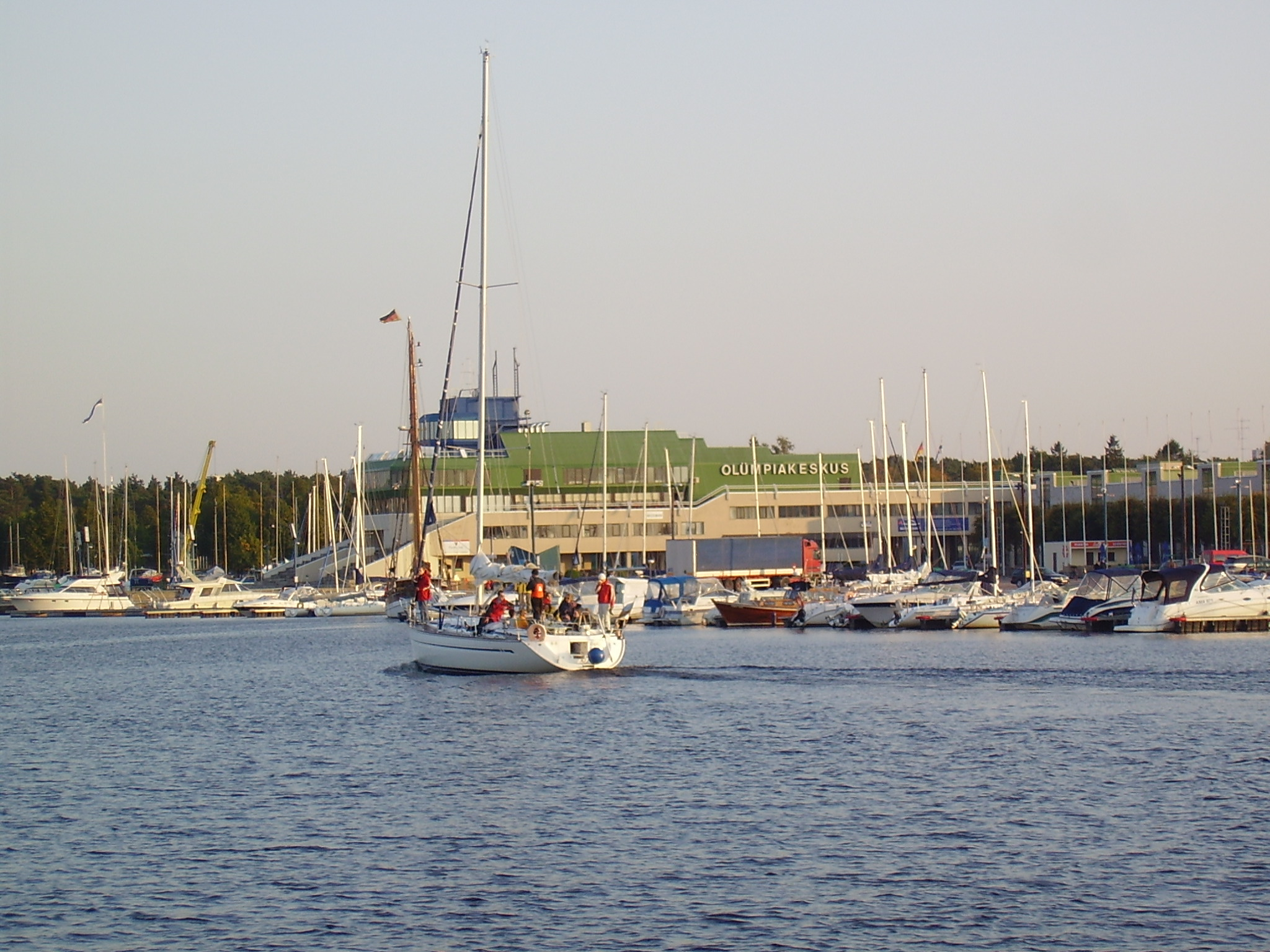
Tallinn Olympic Yachting Centre (2005)

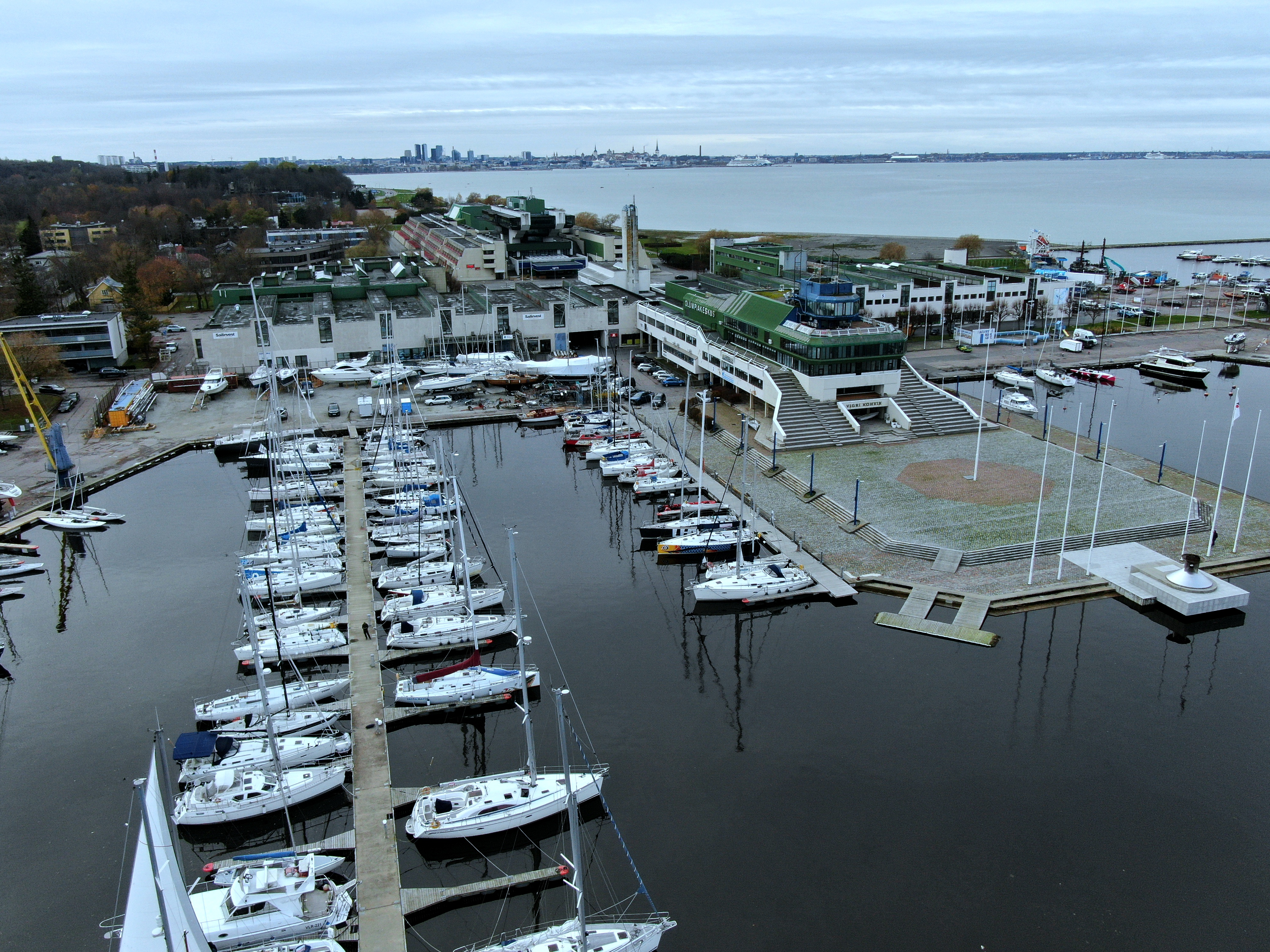
Tallinn Olympic Yachting Centre (2021)

Tallinn Olympic Yachting Centre (Estonian: Tallinna Olümpiapurjespordikeskus, abbreviated TOP; also Pirita Yachting Centre) is a sport complex in Pirita, Tallinn, Estonia.

The complex built in 1980 as sailing infrastructure for Moscow Summer Olympic Games.

The complex was projected by architects Henno Sepmann, Peep Jänes, Ants Raid and Avo-Himm Looveer.

Since 1997 the complex is under protection as the object of architectural heritage of Estonia.
