= Avo-Himm Looveer =

Estonian architect

Avo-Himm Looveer (16 August 1941 – 1 May 2002) was an Estonian architect.

Looveer was born in Kodasema. He was one of the members of artistic collective "The Tallinn Ten" (Estonian: Tallinna 10).

== Works ==
- Tallinn Olympic Yachting Centre (with Henno Sepmann, Peep Jänes and Ants Raid)
- building at Gonsiori and Vilmsi Street (1984–1990)
