= Möldri =

Möldri may refer to:

- Möldri, Saare County, village in Salme Parish, Saare County
- Möldri, Rõuge Parish, village in Rõuge Parish, Võru County
- Möldri, Võru Parish, village in Võru Parish, Võru County
