= Valve Pormeister =

Estonian architect

Valve Pormeister née Ulm (13 April 1922 – 27 October 2002) was an Estonian landscape architect who became an architect. She was one of the first women to influence the development of Estonian architecture, becoming one of the country's most inventive modernisers of rural architecture in the 1960s and 1970s. She is often known as the "Grand Old Lady" of Estonian architecture.

== Biography ==
Pormeister was born in Tallinn, studied briefly agronomy at the University of Tartu and went on to study landscape architecture in Tallinn State Institute of Applied Art. After graduating, she first worked at the Estonian Agricultural Design Institute (1952) but soon moved from landscaping to designing buildings in Estonian Land Development Project of the National Design Institute where she worked until 1992. Despite the fact that she was a woman in a country where architecture had always been a man's profession, she gained wide recognition with her very first work, the Flower Pavilion in Tallinn (1960). Designed as an exhibition venue, the pavilion became a landmark of post-Stalinist architecture with its organic, light appearance, its transparency and its affinity to nature. Pormeister went on to design a gardening exhibition centres in Tallinn and one for a horticultural institute in Moscow (1964). In her Café Tuljak (1964), an extension to the Flower Pavilion, Pormeister was also inspired by Finnish trends, this time by rather heavier, right-angled style with dark wooden cornices. Pormeister's next important project was another Nordic-styled work, The Administrative and Research Centre for the Kurtna Experimental Poultry Farm (1966). Her careful planning, attention to detail and use of matching materials inside and out culminated in a building perfectly suited to its surroundings. It was seen by her contemporaries as being influenced by Alvar Aalto although Pormeister stated she had been strongly influenced by Richard Neutra. Larger projects followed, including Saku's State Plant Protection Station (1975), the Technical School of the State Farm in Jäneda (1975) and the neo-functionalist canteen at the State Farm in Audru (1978). She also built two important buildings on the outskirts of Tartu: the Livestock Breeding and Veterinary Scientific Research Institute (1984) and The Faculty of Forestry and Soil Improvement of the Estonian Academy of Agriculture (1984) on the banks of the Emajõgi River.

Alongside designs, she was over the course of her life a member of many architectural and art commissions, councils and architectural competition juries, as well as a lecturer at the Art Institute (1968-1970).

== Style ==
Pormeister's many varied styles introduced new trends in Estonia, always taking the surrounding landscape fully into consideration. She has been referred to as the primary representative of organic architecture in Estonia, using natural materials as wood, bricks and glass. Her works remain masterpieces of post-war Modernism and served as a source of inspiration for many of her contemporaries.

Her early style in the 1960s was influenced by the soft Nordic modernistic trends developing in Finland, one of the few countries Estonians were permitted to visit at the time. In addition, Finnish television could be received in Estonia and specialised Finnish magazines were also available. This explains the advent of lighter materials such as wood and plaster creating a more user-friendly appeal.

Late 1960s and the 1970s buildings are characterized by daring and bold visions in layout and volumes, sloping surfaces and diagonal lines. She was liable to innovations in architecture and thus began exploring neo-functionalism.

In the late 1970s and during the 1980s her works blended in with the Estonian architectural scene. Her designs also went through post-modern movement. The sensitivity towards building environment and the exploitation of architectural heritage suited her principles well.

During the 1990s, Pormeister designed a number of reconstruction and renovation plans for her previously erected buildings. Towards the end of her life she planned several memorials.

== Work ==
- The Flower Pavilion (1960)
- Café Tuljak (1964)
- The Administrative and Research Centre for the Kurtna Experimental Poultry Farm (1966)
- The canteen-administration building of the Audru Collective Farm (1973)
- The Saku State Plant Protection Station (1974)
- The Technical School of Jäneda State farm (1974)
- The Maarjamäe memorial (together with Allan Murdmaa and Henno Sepmann, 1975) and landscape modeling
- The main building of the Livestock Breeding and Veterinary Scientific Research Institute near Tartu (1984)
- The Faculty of Forestry and Soil Improvement of the Estonian Academy of Agriculture (1984)

== Awards ==
- Soviet Estonian award for the Tallinn Song Festival Grounds and Choir Stand (1965)
- Soviet Estonian award for landscape architecture and the main building at the Kurtna Poultry Experimental Station (1967)
- Honoured Architect of Soviet Estonia (1967)
- State Award of the Soviet SSR for designing of the Saku, Kurtna and Vinni communities (1971)
- Estonian National Lifetime Achievement Award for Culture (2000)
- Order of the White Star, Fifth Class (2001)

== Personal exhibitions ==
- In the Flower Pavilion, 1972 for Valve Pormeister's 50th Anniversary
- Valve Pormeister. Moderniser of Estonian Countryside. Exhibition from March 8 to April 17, 2005 in the Museum of Estonian Architecture.

== Personal life ==
For a short period Valve Pormeister was married to interior architect Valter Pormeister. Her long-term partner was architect Henno Sepmann. The elder sister was Elgi Reemets, an applied artist.

== Photos ==
- Valve Pormeister The National Archives of Estonia photo database. Photo: Olav Tuulik, 1967
- Valve Pormeister, architect of the Estonian Land Development Project The National Archives of Estonia photo database. Photo: Gunnar Loss, 1971

== Literature ==
- Jänes, Liina: Valve Pormeister - Eesti maa-arhitektuuri uuendaja, näitus (Estonian rural architecture innovator, an exhibition), 2005, Tallinn, Eesti Arhitektuurimuuseum, 96 pp. ISBN 9985-9400-9-1.
