= Tsolli =

Tsolli may refer to several placesin Estonia:

- Tsolli, Rõuge Parish, village in Rõuge Parish, Võru County
- Tsolli, Võru Parish, village in Võru Parish, Võru County
