= Paloveere =

Paloveere may refer to:

- Paloveere, Setomaa Parish, village in Meremäe Parish, Võru County
- Paloveere, Võru Parish, village in Vastseliina Parish, Võru County
