= Savioja =

Savioja may refer to several places in Estonia:

- Savioja, Rõuge Parish, village in Võru County, Estonia
- Savioja, Võru Parish, village in Võru County, Estonia
