= Perametsa =

Perametsa may refer to:

- Perametsa, Tartu County, village in Peipsiääre Parish, Tartu County
- Perametsa, Võru County, village in Vastseliina Parish, Võru County
