= Lake Tabina =

Lake in Estonia

- Tabina järv (Estonian)
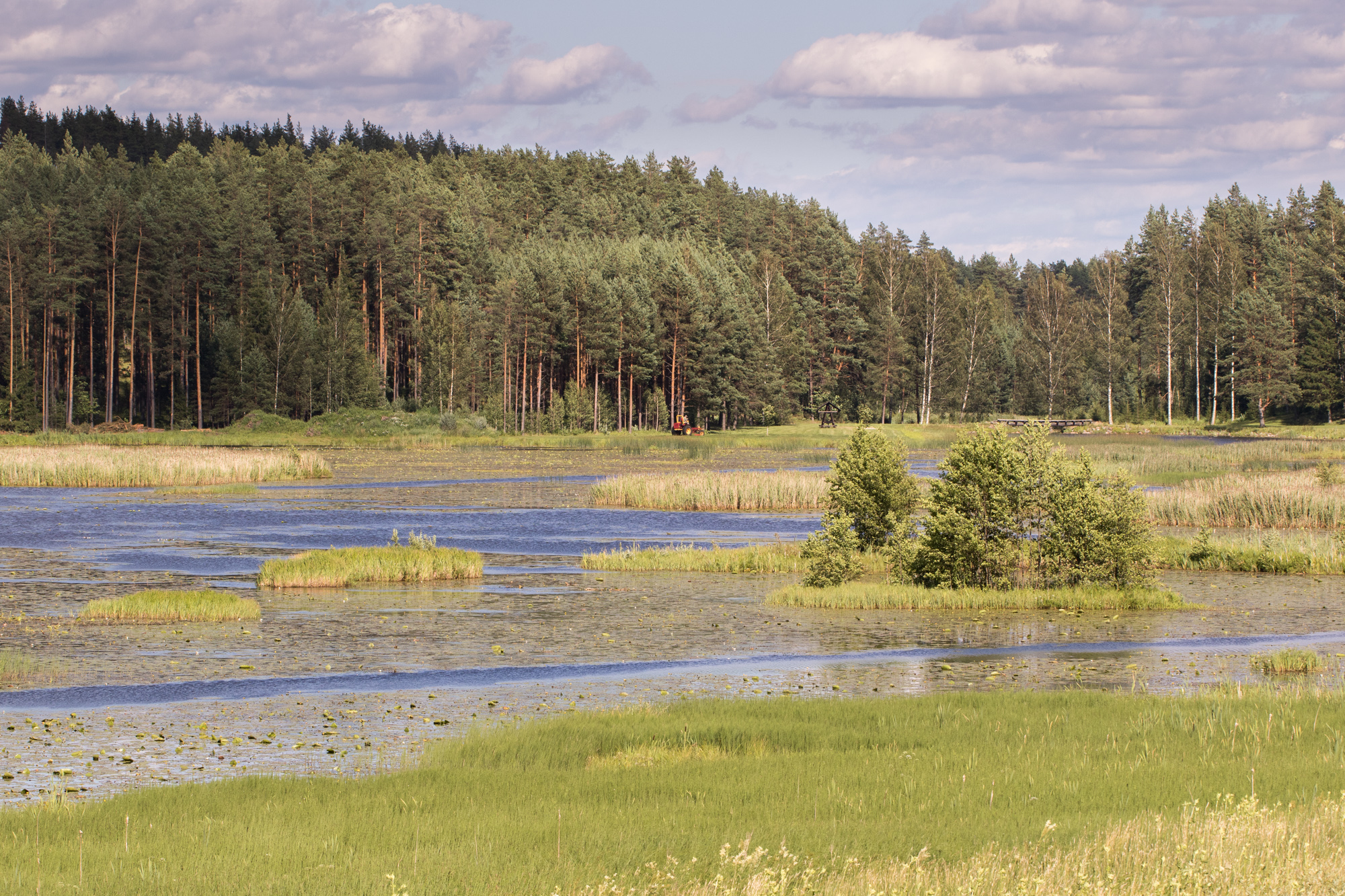

- Location within Estonia
- Location: Võru County
- Coordinates: 57.8159785°N 27.3157762°E
- Basin countries: Estonia
- Max. length: 1,320 meters (4,330 ft)
- Surface area: 25.1 hectares (62 acres)
- Shore length^{1}: 7,130 meters (23,390 ft)
- Surface elevation: 63.9 meters (210 ft)
- Islands: 10
- ^{1} Shore length is not a well-defined measure.

Lake Tabina (Estonian: Tabina järv) is a lake in Estonia. It is located in the village of Tabina in Võru Parish, Võru County.

== Physical description ==
The lake has an area of 25.1 hectares (62 acres), and it has 10 islands with a combined area of 11.1 hectares (27 acres). It is 1,320 meters (4,330 ft) long, and its shoreline measures 7,130 meters (23,390 ft).

== See also ==
- List of lakes of Estonia
