= Saarde =

Saarde may refer to several places in Estonia:

- Saarde Parish, municipality in Pärnu County
- Saarde, Pärnu County, village in Saarde Parish, Pärnu County
- Saarde, Võru County, village in Vastseliina Parish, Võru County
