= Leila Pärtelpoeg =

Estonian interior architect (1927–2025)

- Born: Leila Pelmas; 17 September 1927; Tallinn, Estonia
- Died: 21 November 2025 (aged 98); Tallinn, Estonia
- Education: Estonian Academy of Arts
- Occupations: Interior architect; professor
- Known for: Restoration of Palmse Manor, Sagadi Manor, and Vihula Manor
- Awards: Order of the White Star, IV Class (2001)

Leila Pärtelpoeg (née Brakel, until 1951 Pelmas; 17 September 1927 – 21 November 2025) was an Estonian interior architect and professor. She is regarded as a leading figure in Estonian interior architecture, known particularly for her expertise in historic interiors and the restoration of manor houses.

== Early life and education ==
Pärtelpoeg was born in Tallinn. She attended the Tallinn English College from 1934 to 1940 and graduated from secondary school in 1946. She studied architecture at the Tallinn Polytechnic Institute before transferring to the State Art Institute of the Estonian SSR (ERKI), where she graduated in 1954 with a specialization in spatial design under Professor Edgar Johan Kuusik.

== Career ==
After graduating in 1954, Pärtelpoeg worked at the Estonian branch of the USSR Chamber of Commerce until 1961. From 1961 to 1978, she was an interior architect at the design bureau KIPR (Design Bureau of the Ministry of Commerce). During this period, she designed interiors for several iconic modernist cafes and restaurants in Tallinn, often collaborating with architects Väino Tamm and Allan Murdmaa. Her notable works from this era include the interiors of the cafes Pegasus, Vana Toomas, Energia, Tuljak, and the restaurant Gloria.

From 1961 to 1982, she taught at the Department of Spatial and Furniture Design at ERKI (now the Estonian Academy of Arts), becoming a docent in 1973. She influenced a generation of Estonian interior architects.

== Restoration of historic interiors ==
Beginning in the 1970s, Pärtelpoeg focused on the restoration of historic interiors, becoming a renowned expert in the field. She led the interior restoration and furnishing of several major Estonian manor houses:

- Palmse Manor (1972–1986) – a comprehensive restoration using original period furniture
- Rägavere Manor (1979–1983)
- Sagadi Manor (1982–1986)
- Saku Manor (1984)
- Kolga Manor (1985–1987) – steward's house and stables
- Vihula Manor (1994–1995)

Her other significant projects included the interior design of the Tallinn Town Hall, the Riigikogu (Parliament) building in Toompea Castle, and the restoration of St. John's Church in Saint Petersburg (2011). She also redesigned the President's Office of the Republic of Estonia.

== Death ==
Pärtelpoeg died in Tallinn on 21 November 2025, at the age of 98.

== Awards ==
- 1984: Merited Architect of the Estonian SSR
- 2001: Order of the White Star, IV Class
- 2010: National Lifetime Achievement Award for Culture (Riigi kultuuripreemia)
- 2020: Annual Award of the Architecture Endowment of the Cultural Endowment of Estonia (Lifetime Achievement Award)

== Publications ==
- Mööbel (Furniture). Tallinn, 1995
- Härra Vene maailm... – Yearbook of Viljandi Museum. Viljandi, 2000
- Pööningul (In the Attic). Tallinn, 2005
- Tööraamat / A Life's Work. Compiled by K. Roosi. Tartu, 2011
