= Peep Jänes =

Estonian architect

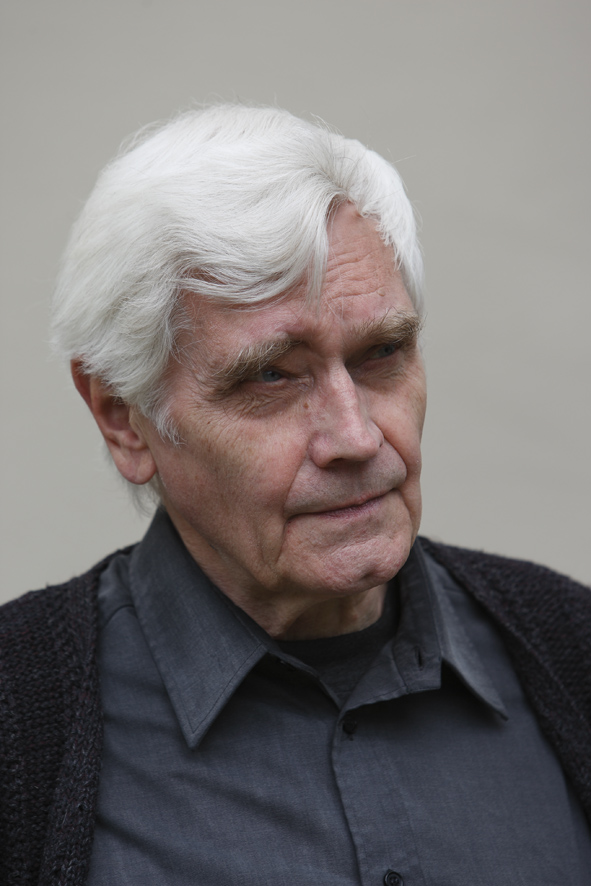
Peep Jänes (2009)

Peep Jänes (born 26 December 1936 in Rakvere, Estonia) is an Estonian architect.

He graduated from Tallinn Secondary School No. 2 (Tallinna Reaalkool) in 1955 and studied in the TPI from 1955 to 1958 and from 1958 to 1963 in the ERKI, where he graduated as an architect. Peep Jänes is one of Estonia's most important Soviet-era architects who developed daring formal solutions during difficult times. His five decades of work are characterized by well-publicized buildings and objects of significance. Peep Jänes has designed over 300 buildings, projects and competitions.

He acted mainly during the Soviet period – 1970s and 1980s. His architectural style is predominantly modernist. He worked in Tallinn in 1963–68 and 1975–1993 in the "Estonian Project". 1968–1975 "Land Design Project" and 1994 "Kolde Project".

Since 1964, he has been a member of the Architectural Union.

== Career ==
Jänes is the architect of the Pirita Olympic Sports Center (1975–1980, with Henno Sepmann, Ants Raid and Himm Looveer, 1980; USSR Prize 1981 and the International Architects' Union (UIA) Biennial Interarch 83)

According to his design, the Mustamäe Municipality Center was built in Tallinn (1963–1970, also known as the "Kännu Kukk" restaurant).

- Dynamo Tennis Hall in Kadriorg (1978, with M. Vainik)
- Ski Base in Otepää (1978, with T. Mellik)
- Tamsalu Culture House (1980, with T. Mellik)
- Extension of Kuressaare Hospital (1981–1993, with I. Heinsoo and L. Kikkas; Diploma of the USSR AL 1986)
- The designers' house on the Rävala street in Tallinn (1981, with A. Niinevälä and M. Pordi)
- Mall "Turist" (1982, with H. Sepmann)
- Writers' House in Kadriorg (1995, with L. Kikkas)
- Gallery Cafe on Viru Street (1995)
- "Järvakandi Factories" clubhouse (1986, with H. Sepmann)
- Padise Center with three-story terrace houses (with T. Mellik, 1977; USSR AL Award 1981 and Estonian SSR Award 1985)
- Stockmann Department Store
- Town House of Art Workers in Tallinn, Meriväljaja Ranniku tee 29

Among other things, he was one of the architects of the reconstruction of the Estonian Theater.

In addition, there are several private houses and garden houses.

== Credits ==
- 1961 UIA congress in London for student work (with Ilmar Puumetsa)
- 1976 Honored Architect of the Estonian SSR
- 1978 Sirbi and Summer Architectural Award (Tehvandi Ski Center)
- 1981 State Prize of the USSR (Tallinn Olympic Yachting Center)
- 1982 Award for the best building in Estonia (Designer's House)
- 1983 UIA Sofia Biennale Special Prize (Tallinn Olympic Sports Center)
- 1985 Estonian National Prize (Planning of Padise settlement and terrace houses)
- 1986 Estonian Award for Best Building Award (Kuressaare Hospital)
- 1987 Alar Kotli Architectural Award
- 2008 Annual Contribution to the Estonian Cultural Endowment for Architecture (Raudna Basic School Sports Gym in Heimtali)
