= Café Tuljak =

Restaurant in Tallinn, Estonia

- Interactive map of Café Tuljak

Restaurant information
- Location: Pirita Tee 26e, 10127 Tallinn, Estonia, Tallinn, 10127, Estonia
- Coordinates: 59°26′54″N 24°48′24″E
- Website: tuljak.ee

Café Tuljak is a cafe in Tallinn, Estonia. The cafe's interior is designed by Valve Pormeister in 1964 as an annex to her previously designed Flower Pavilion (1960). The building was turned into a restaurant Carina in the 1990s, but stood empty from 2002 till restoration in 2015.

== Style ==
New architectural aesthetics arrived in Estonia through Finland in the mid-1960s and Valve Pormeister is considered to be the one who introduced it. The horizontal wooden cornice, mostly strained dark was used to conceal wooden trusses as well as for purely aesthetic purposes and forms the main characteristic of this style. Although built very close to the Flower Pavilion temporally and physically, these two are expressions of two different stages of post-war Nordic modernism joined together on the principle of contrast. From Pirita Road, only two horizontal stripes are visible: the concrete handrail of the terrace and the wide cornice of the building. The facade consists of red bricks and the three walls of the main cafeteria hall have wide minimally framed windows from the ceiling to the floor. The building is rigidly rectangular. The connecting gallery glass walls are lower and the wall surface between the glass and the overhanging roof is covered with dark wooden siding. An outdoor terrace with fireplace was designed for barbecue shashlik.

Original interior was designed by Estonian interior architects Vello Asi and Väino Tamm. Restaurant Carina was designed by Rein Laur and the current restoration interior architect is Tarmo Priimets together with Martti Siimann.
