= Alar Kotli =

Estonian architect

Alar Kotli in 1957

Alar Kotli (27 August 1904 in Väike-Maarja – 4 October 1963 in Tallinn) was an Estonian architect. He studied sculpture at the art school Pallas in Tartu during 1922–1923 and mathematics at the University of Tartu. He graduated from the University of technology in Gdańsk (then Free City of Danzig) in 1927 as an architect.

Among the most famous and influential Estonian architects, Kotli has created several important landmarks in Tallinn. These include the Estonian Song Festival grounds (1957–1960, with Henno Sepmann & E. Paalmann), the main building of Tallinn University (1938–1940, with Erika Nõva), the Art Fund building (1949–1953) and the administrative building in Kadriorg park (currently the residence of the president of the Republic of Estonia) in conjunction with architect Olev Siinmaa (1937–1938). Kotli has also created many experimental apartment building projects, which were widely used after World War II when there was a serious need for new dwellings. Smaller buildings (for two families) were used in the 1950s as lottery jackpots.

Kotli's style has varied over the years. He has designed many functionalistic buildings in the 1930s, for example — schoolhouses in Rakvere (1935–1938) and Tapa (1936–1939). The Presidential Palace, also dating from the 1930s, can be categorised as historicism, while his 1950s and 1960s style is similar to brutalism.

== Gallery ==
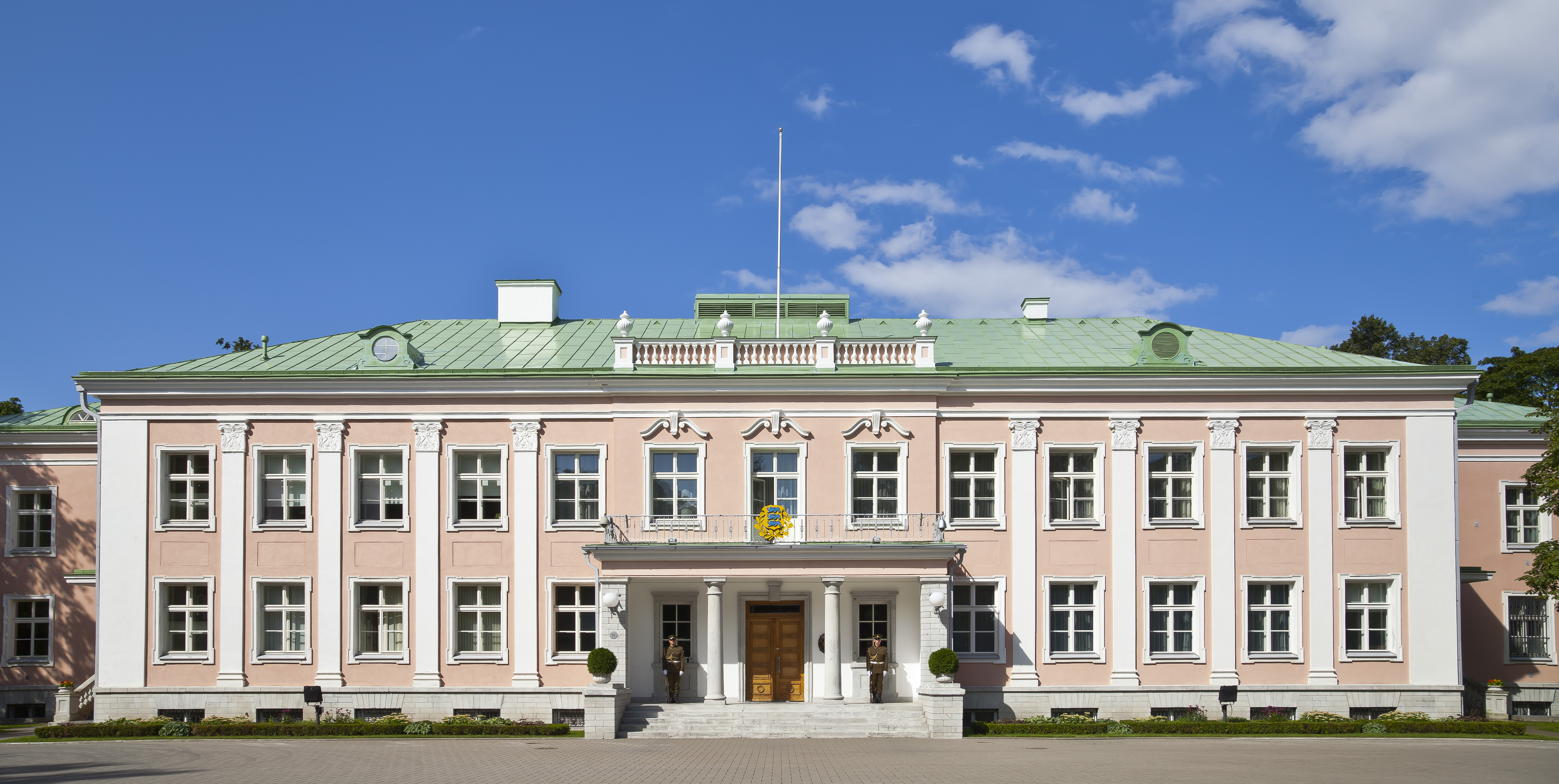
The administrative building in Kadriorg park, built in 1938, is now used as the residence of the president of the Republic of Estonia.

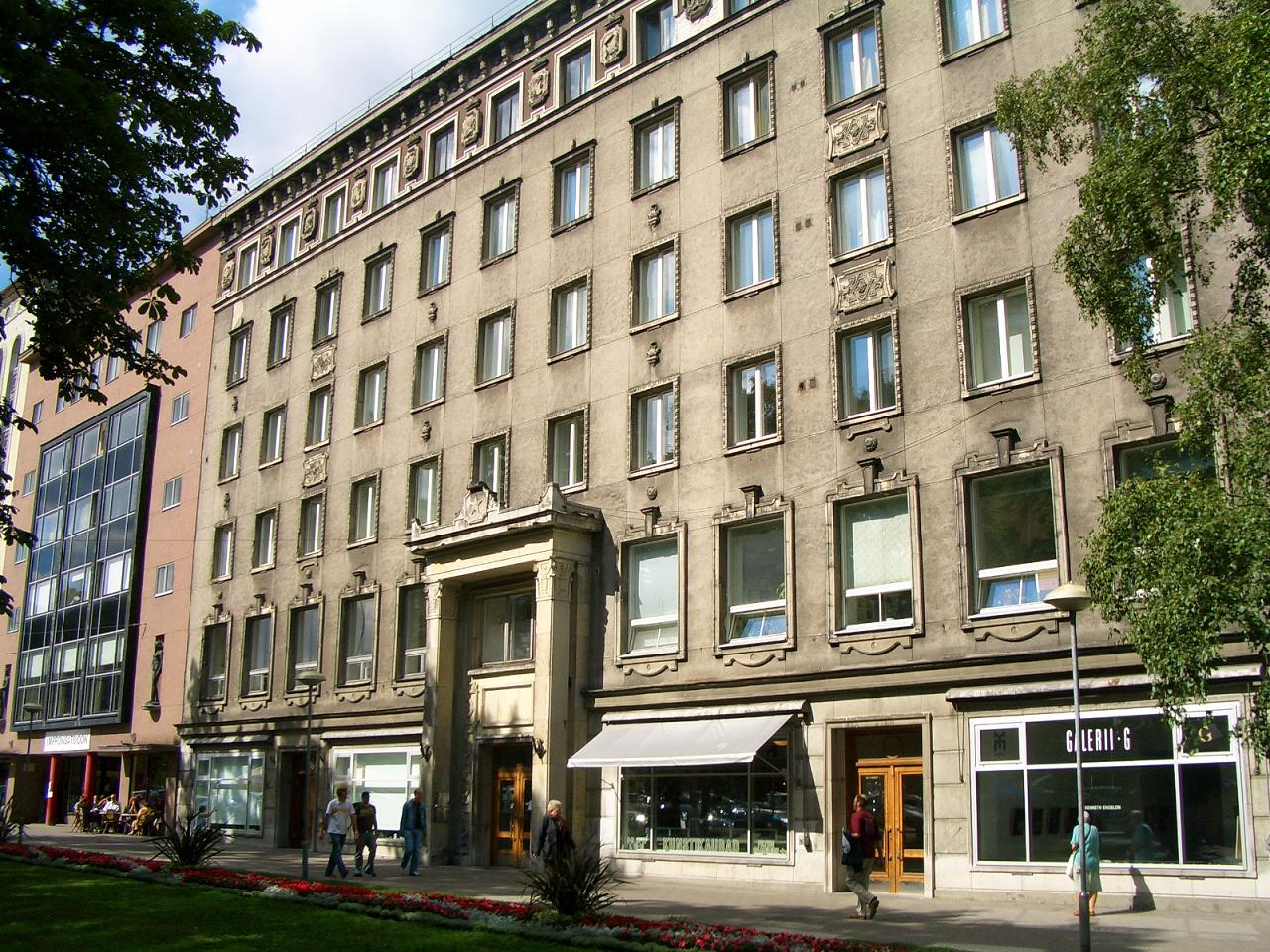
Art Fund building (1949-1953) on Freedom Square in Tallinn. Under the pressure of sovietization, many Soviet-style details were added to this building.

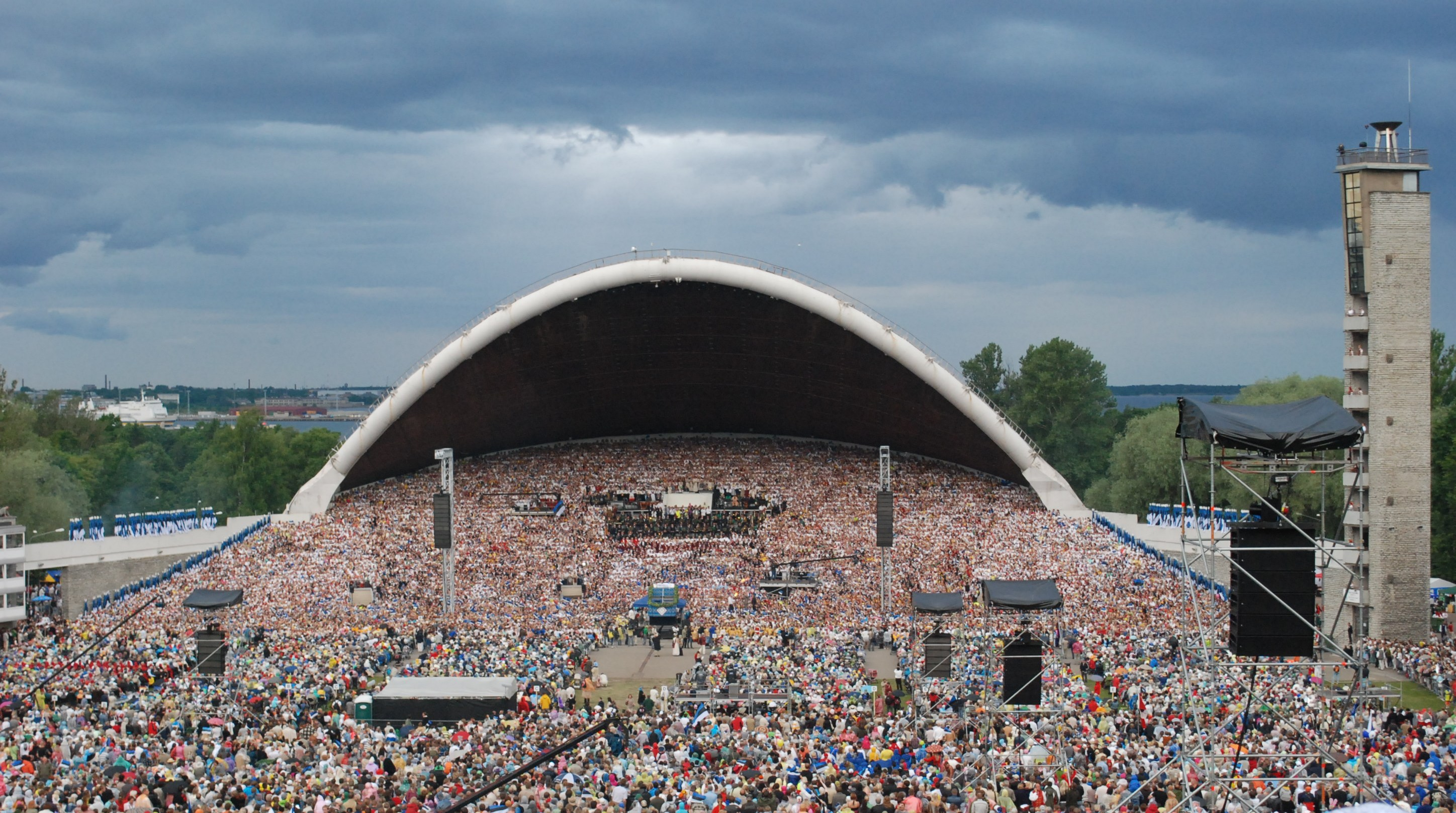
Tallinn Song Festival Grounds

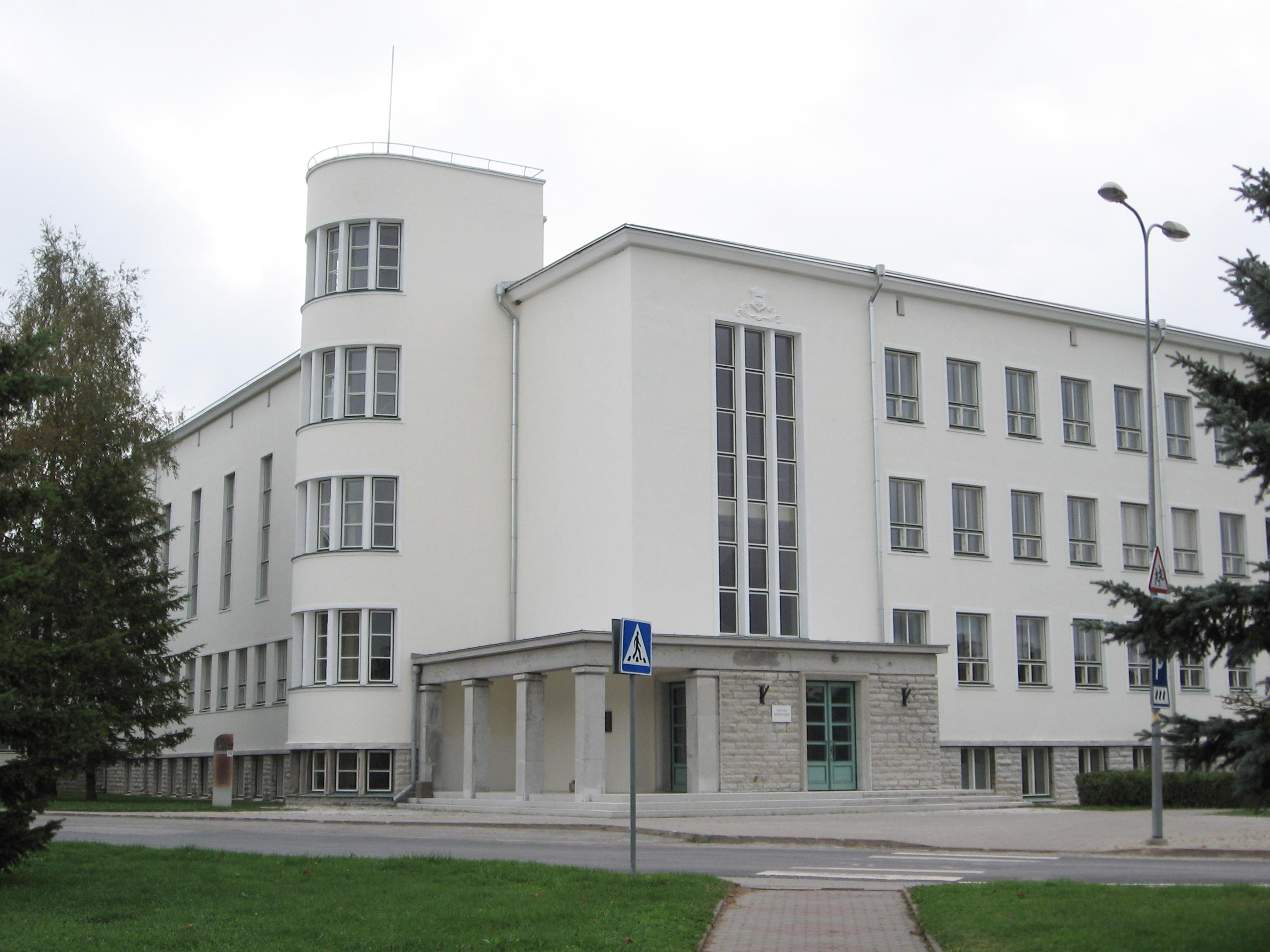
High school in Rakvere.
