= Vana-Saaluse =

Village in Estonia

- Location within Estonia
- Coordinates: 57°43′25″N 27°12′44″E
- Country: Estonia
- County: Võru County

Area
  - Total: 8.730 km^{2} (3.371 sq mi)

Population (2021)
  - Total: 33
  - Density: 3.78/km^{2} (9.8/sq mi)
- Time zone: UTC+2 (EET)

Vana-Saaluse is a village in Võru Parish, Võru County in southeastern Estonia. Between 1991–2017 (until the administrative reform of Estonian municipalities) the village was located in Vastseliina Parish.

Interior architect, designer and pedagogue Vello Asi (Vello Ergav, born 1927) was born in Vana-Saaluse.

== See also ==
- Vana-Saaluse Manor
