= Plessi =

Village in Estonia

Coordinates: 57°45′N 27°22′E

- Interactive map of Plessi
- Country: Estonia
- County: Võru County
- Time zone: UTC+2 (EET)

Plessi is a settlement in Võru Parish, Võru County in southeastern Estonia.
