= Holsta =

Village in Estonia

- Location within Estonia
- Coordinates: 57°45′54″N 27°9′4″E
- Country: Estonia
- County: Võru County
- Time zone: UTC+2 (EET)

Holsta is a village in Võru Parish, Võru County in southeastern Estonia.
