= Sutte =

Village in Estonia

- Location within Estonia
- Coordinates: 57°48′41″N 27°14′36″E
- Country: Estonia
- County: Võru County
- Municipality: Võru Parish

Population
  - Total: 24

Sutte is a village in Võru Parish, Estonia, which belongs to Võru County.
