= Hinniala =

Village in Estonia

- Location within Estonia
- Coordinates: 57°46′08″N 27°21′41″E
- Country: Estonia
- County: Võru County
- Municipality: Võru Parish

Population
  - Total: 11

Hinniala is a village in Estonia, in Võru Parish, which belongs to Võru County. As of the 2011 census, Hinniala has a population of 6.
