= Kerepäälse =

Village in Estonia

- Location within Estonia
- Coordinates: 57°47′04″N 27°19′24″E
- Country: Estonia
- County: Võru County
- Municipality: Võru Parish

Population
  - Total: 16

Kerepäälse is a village in Estonia, in Võru Parish, which belongs to Võru County.
