= Raadi, Võru County =

Village in Estonia

Raadi
- Location within Estonia
- Coordinates: 57°45′45″N 27°18′24″E
- Country: Estonia
- County: Võru County
- Municipality: Võru Parish

Population
  - Total: 3

Raadi is a village in Estonia, in Võru Parish, which belongs to Võru County.
