= Heinasoo =

Village in Estonia

- Location within Estonia
- Coordinates: 57°41′35″N 27°16′31″E
- Country: Estonia
- County: Võru County
- Time zone: UTC+2 (EET)

Heinasoo is a settlement in Võru Parish, Võru County in southeastern Estonia speaking the language Võro.
