= Kõo, Võru County =

Village in Estonia

Kõo
- Location within Estonia
- Coordinates: 57°41′2″N 27°11′41″E
- Country: Estonia
- County: Võru County
- Time zone: UTC+2 (EET)

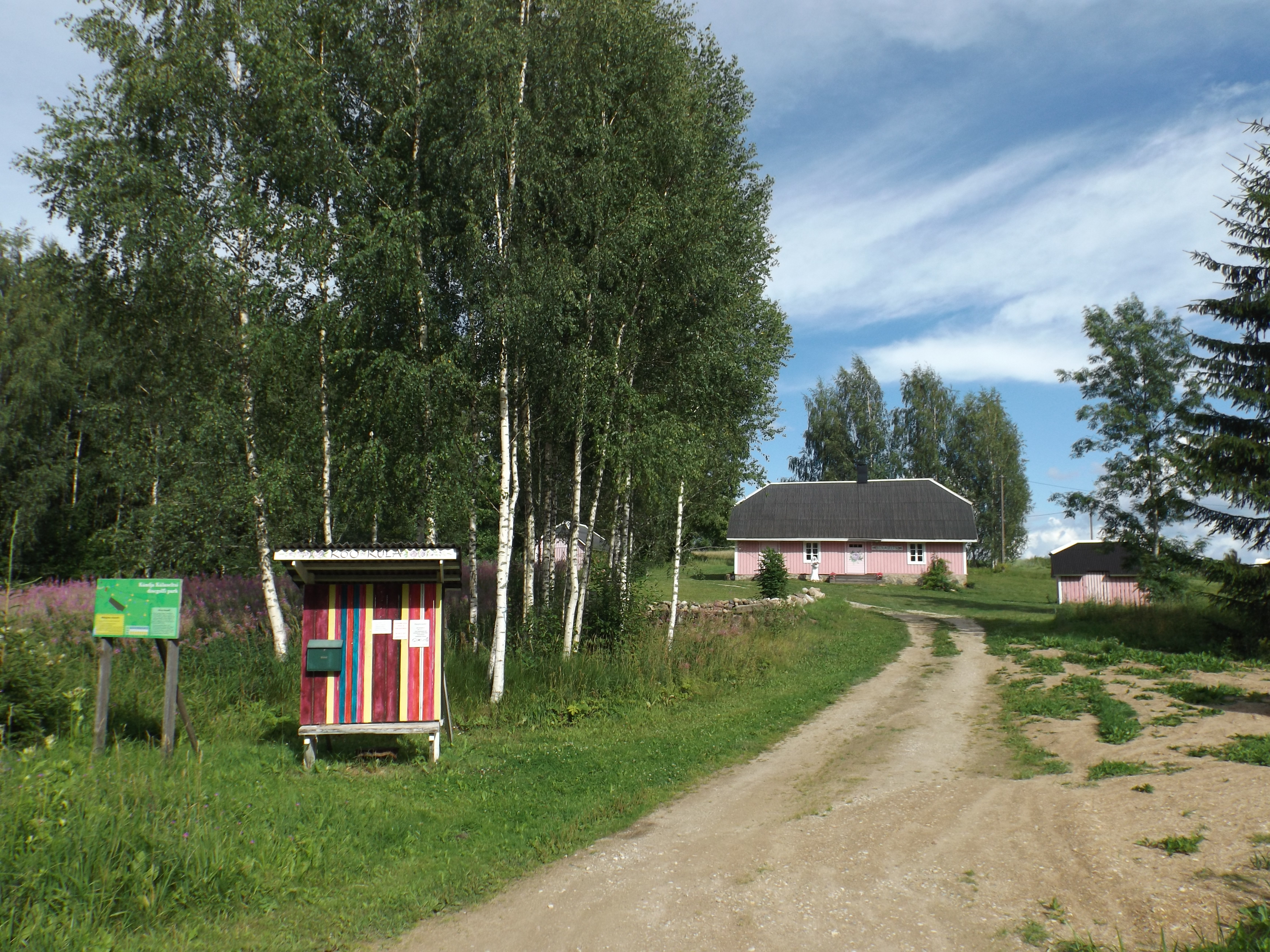

Kõo is a village in Võru Parish, Võru County in southeastern Estonia.
