= Vatsa, Estonia =

Village in Estonia

Vatsa
- Village
- Location within Estonia
- Coordinates: 57°41′40″N 27°19′31″E
- Country: Estonia
- County: Võru County
- Municipality: Võru Parish

Population
  - Total: 20

Vatsa is a village in Estonia, in Võru Parish, which belongs to Võru County.
