= Juraski =

Village in Estonia

- Location within Estonia
- Coordinates: 57°44′39″N 27°14′29″E
- Country: Estonia
- County: Võru County
- Time zone: UTC+2 (EET)

Juraski is a settlement in Võru Parish, Võru County in southeastern Estonia.
