= Kornitsa, Estonia =

Village in Estonia

Kornitsa
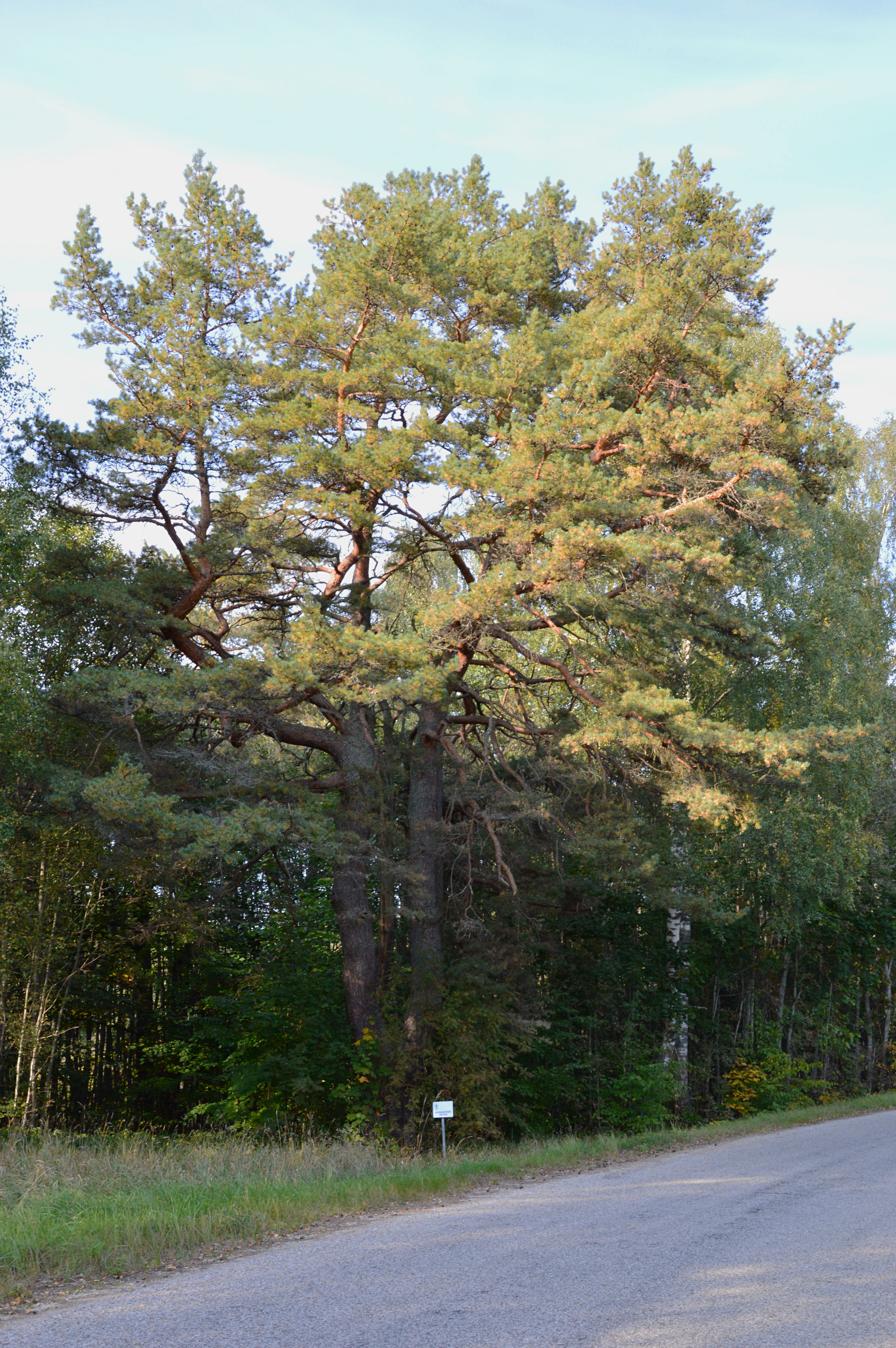
- Koobaskõsõ pine in Kornitsa

- Location within Estonia
- Coordinates: 57°45′29″N 27°18′10″E
- Country: Estonia
- County: Võru County
- Municipality: Võru Parish

Population
  - Total: 2

Kornitsa is a village in Estonia, in Võru Parish, which belongs to Võru County.
