= Tellaste =

Village in Estonia

- Village
- Location within Estonia
- Coordinates: 57°46′32″N 27°21′36″E
- Country: Estonia
- County: Võru County
- Municipality: Võru Parish

Population
  - Total: 1

Tellaste is a village in Estonia, in Võru Parish, which belongs to Võru County.
