= Käpa, Estonia =

Village in Estonia

Käpa
- Location within Estonia
- Coordinates: 57°43′36″N 27°08′35″E
- Country: Estonia
- County: Võru County
- Municipality: Võru Parish

Population
  - Total: 1

Käpa is a village in Estonia, in Võru Parish, which belongs to Võru County.
