= Tallikeste =

Village in Estonia

- Village
- Location within Estonia
- Coordinates: 57°44′36″N 27°21′51″E
- Country: Estonia
- County: Võru County
- Municipality: Võru Parish

Population
  - Total: 17

Tallikeste is a village in Estonia, in Võru Parish, which belongs to Võru County.
