= Sagadi =

Village in Estonia

Coordinates: 59°32′07″N 26°02′45″E

- Village
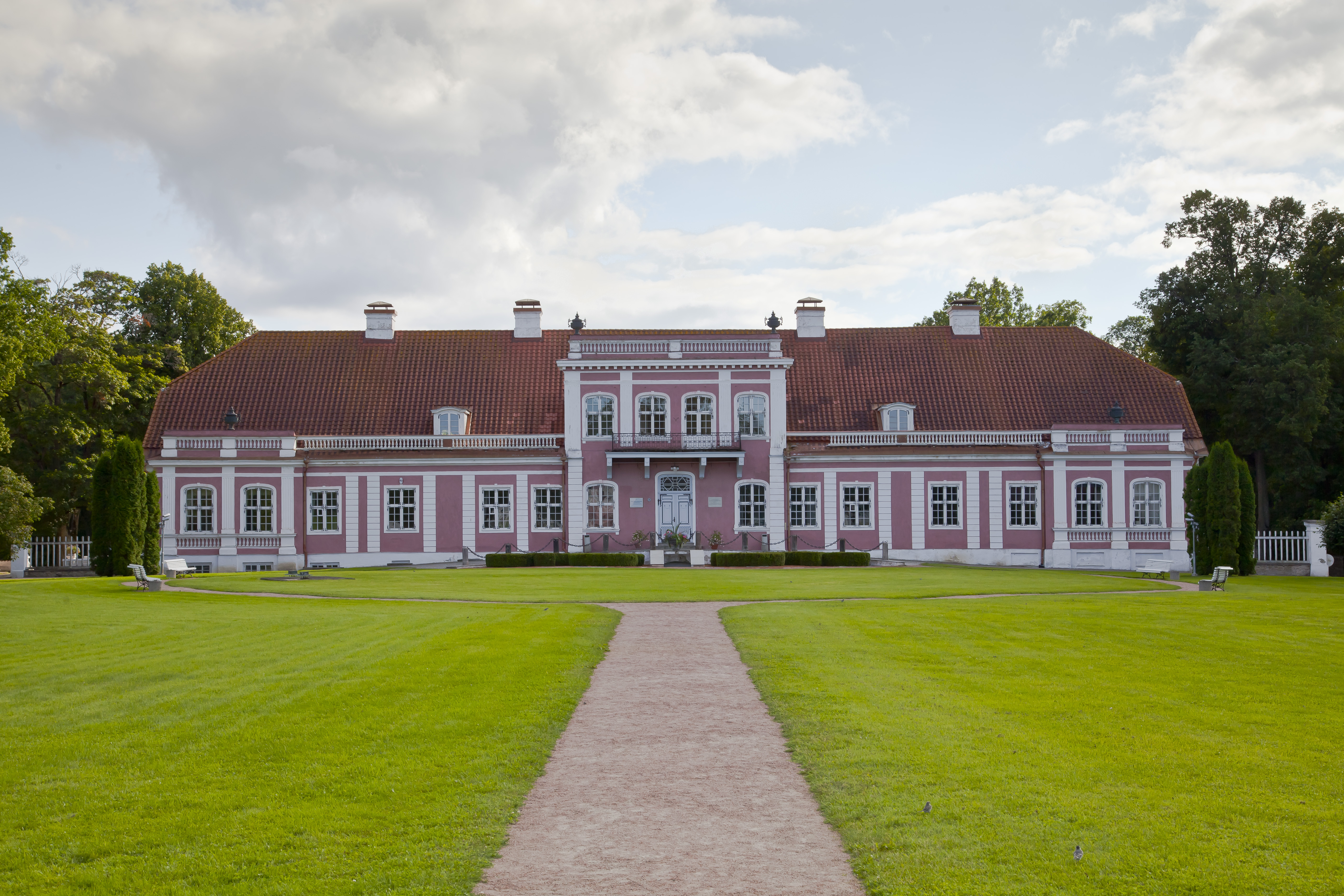
- Sagadi Manor
- Interactive map of Sagadi
- Country: Estonia
- County: Lääne-Viru County
- Parish: Haljala Parish
- Time zone: UTC+2 (EET)
  - Summer (DST): UTC+3 (EEST)

Sagadi is a village in Haljala Parish, Lääne-Viru County, in northern Estonia, located within the territory of Lahemaa National Park.

== Sagadi Manor ==
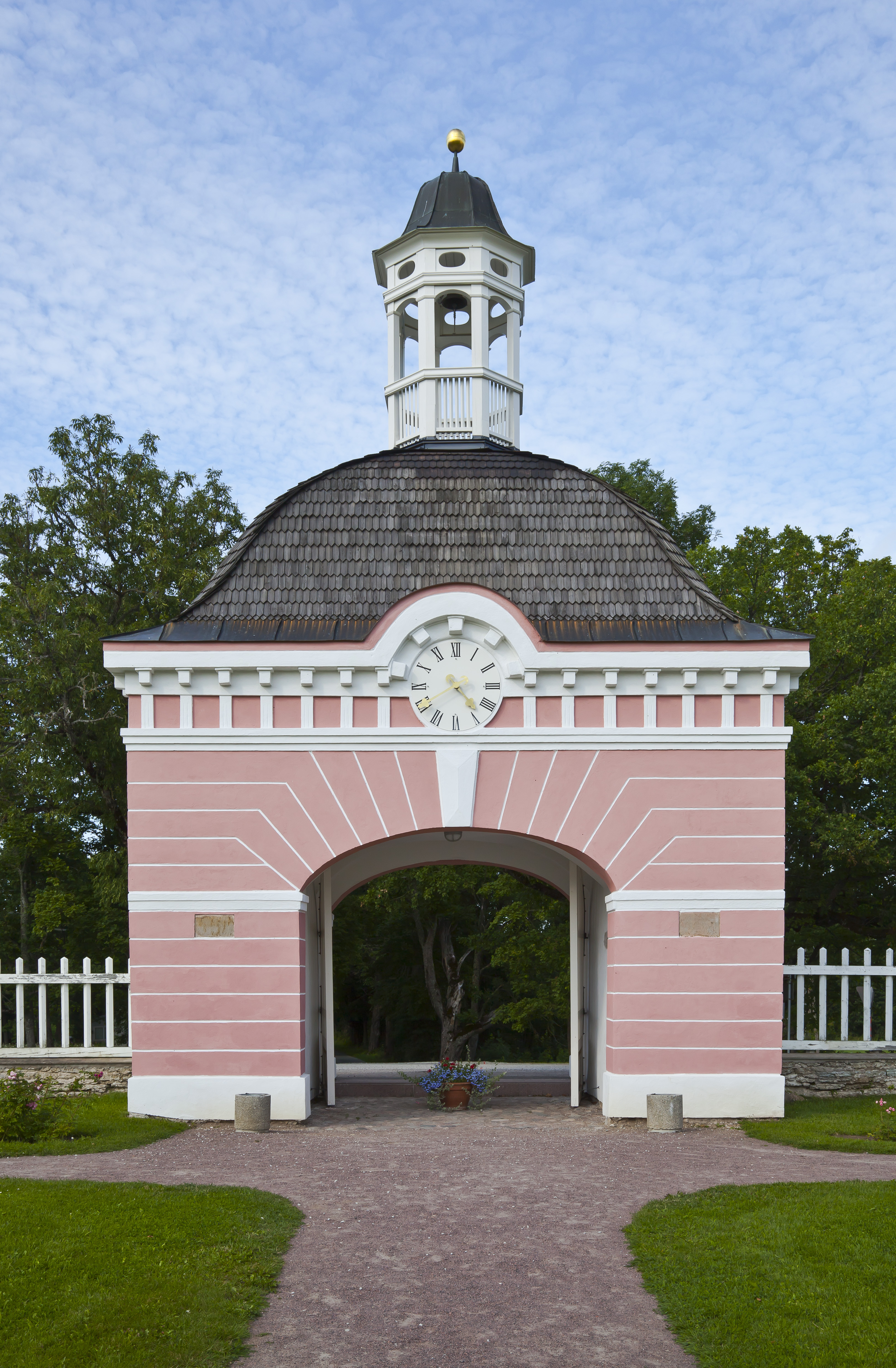
The gatehouse at Sagadi Manor

Sagadi Manor (German: Saggad) was first mentioned in written records in 1469. During its history, it belonged to several different Baltic German families. A rococo-style manor house was built from 1749 to 1753, the plans for which have unusually been preserved. The von Fock family, which owned the estate, hired the master builder Johan Nicolaus Vogel to build the house. The building was rebuilt from 1793 to 1795 and acquired its present elegant early classicist look at that time. Minor changes were made in 1894 under the guidance of the architect Rudolf von Engelhardt. During most of the 20th century, the manor housed a school. It was renovated from 1977 to 1987.

The manor house ensemble, complete with 20 outbuildings and a park, remains one of the most well-kept manor house complexes in Estonia. In the main house, numerous details, such as painted ceilings and carved wooden stairs, have been restored, and the main house is historically furnished.

== See also ==
- Lahemaa National Park
- List of palaces and manor houses in Estonia
