= Külaoru =

Village in Estonia

- Location within Estonia
- Coordinates: 57°44′39″N 27°16′26″E
- Country: Estonia
- County: Võru County
- Time zone: UTC+2 (EET)

Külaoru is a village in Võru Parish, Võru County in southeastern Estonia.

== Gallery ==
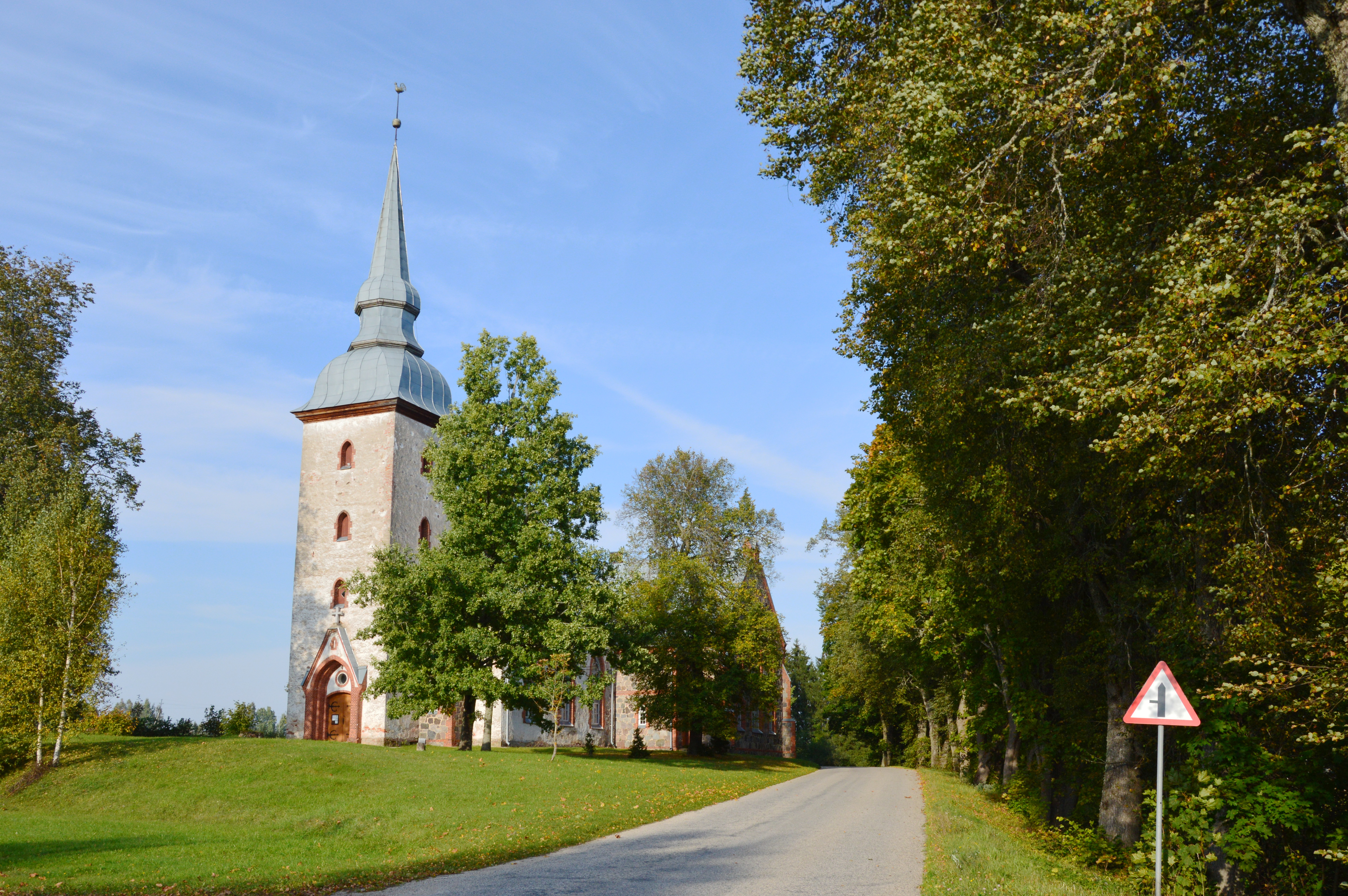
Vastseliina church

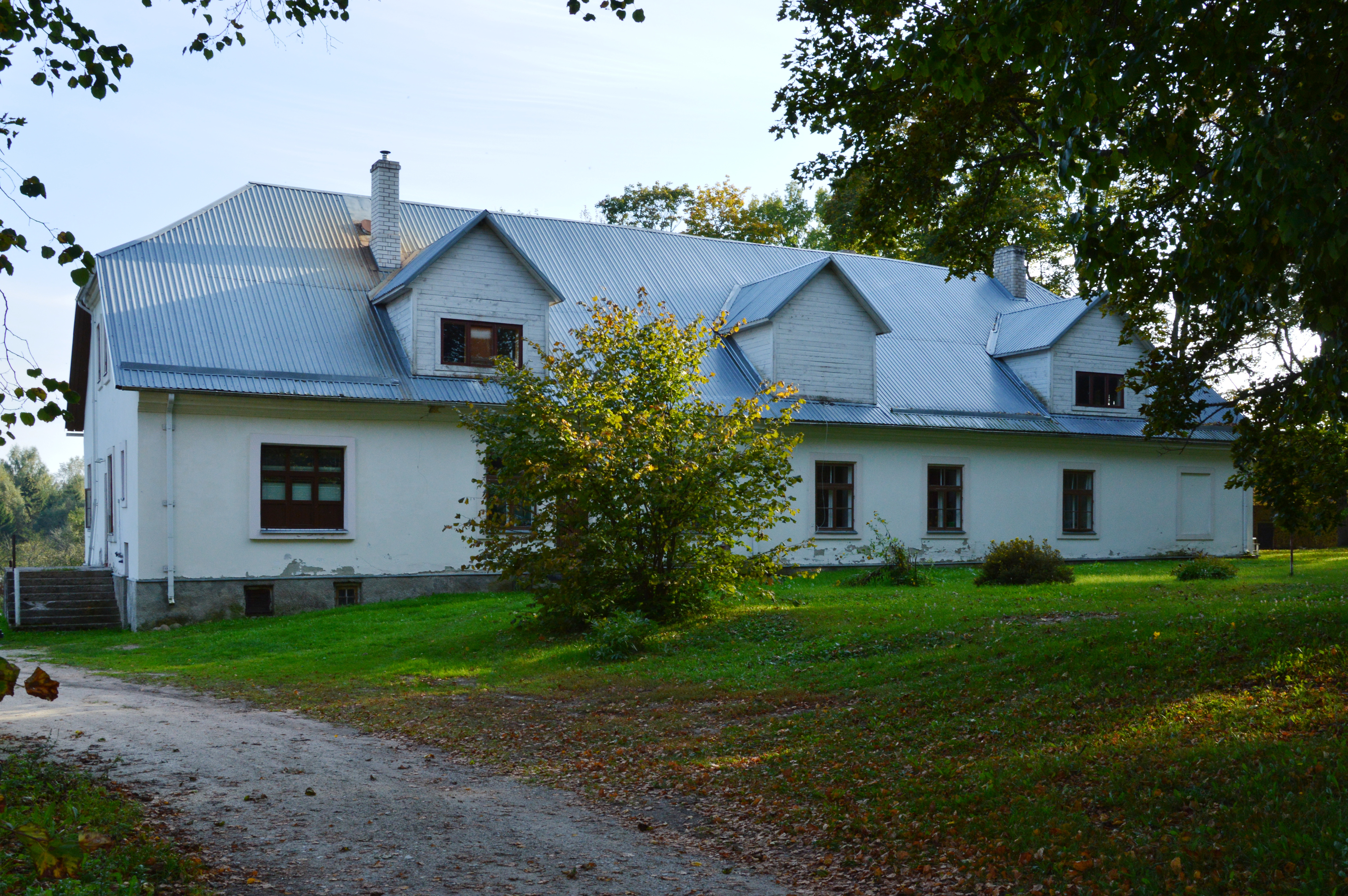

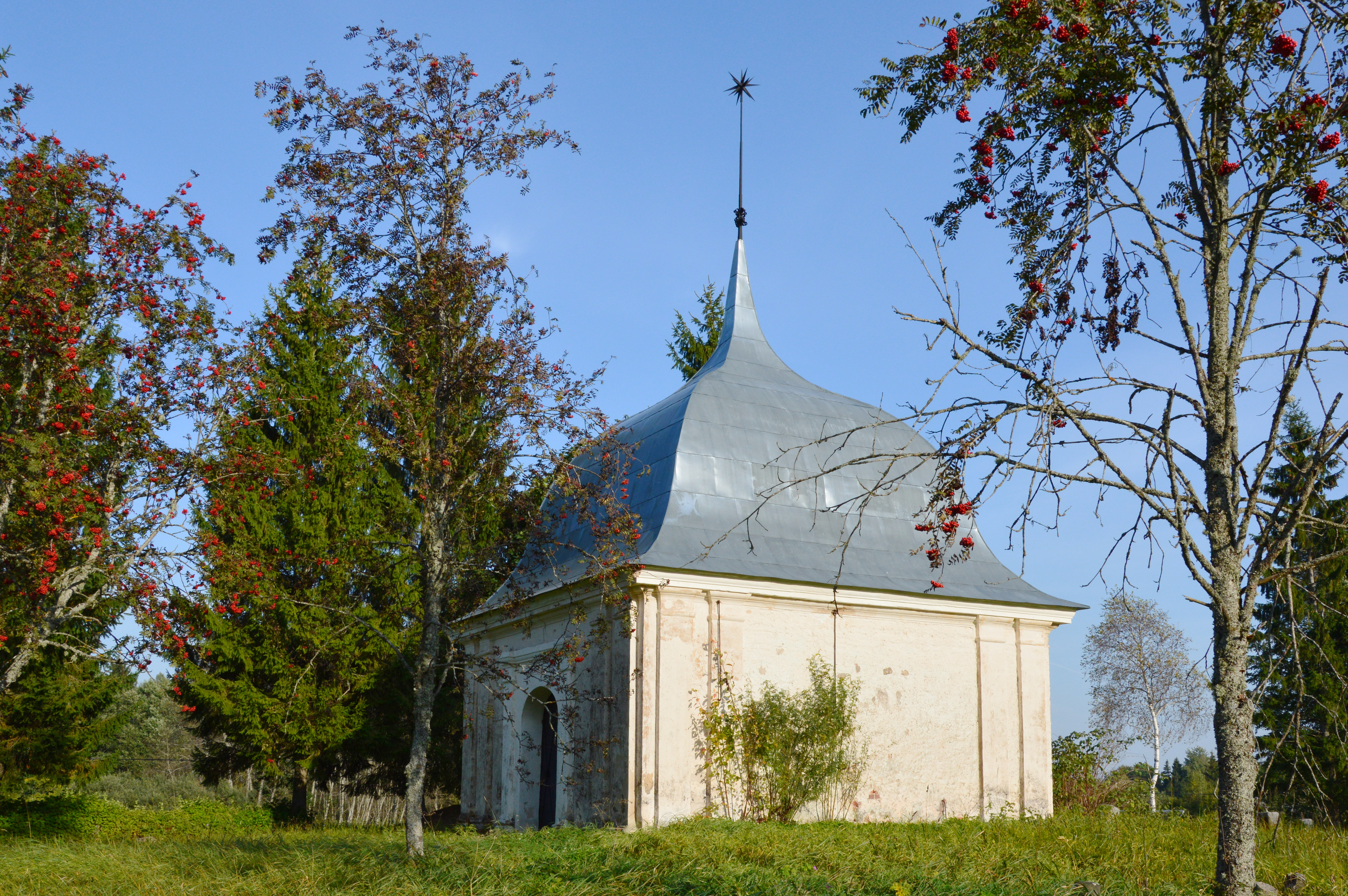
Manor chapel
