= Mäe-Kõoküla =

Village in Estonia

- Location within Estonia
- Coordinates: 57°48′10″N 27°20′08″E
- Country: Estonia
- County: Võru County
- Municipality: Võru Parish

Population
  - Total: 12

Mäe-Kõoküla is a village in Estonia, in Võru Parish, which belongs to Võru County.
