= Luhte =

Village in Estonia

- Location within Estonia
- Coordinates: 57°41′05″N 27°10′04″E
- Country: Estonia
- County: Võru County
- Municipality: Võru Parish

Population
  - Total: 15

Luhte is a village in Estonia, in Võru Parish, which belongs to Võru County.
