= Tabina, Estonia =

Village in Estonia

Tabina
- Village
- Location within Estonia
- Coordinates: 57°48′47″N 27°18′39″E
- Country: Estonia
- County: Võru County
- Municipality: Võru Parish

Population
  - Total: 20

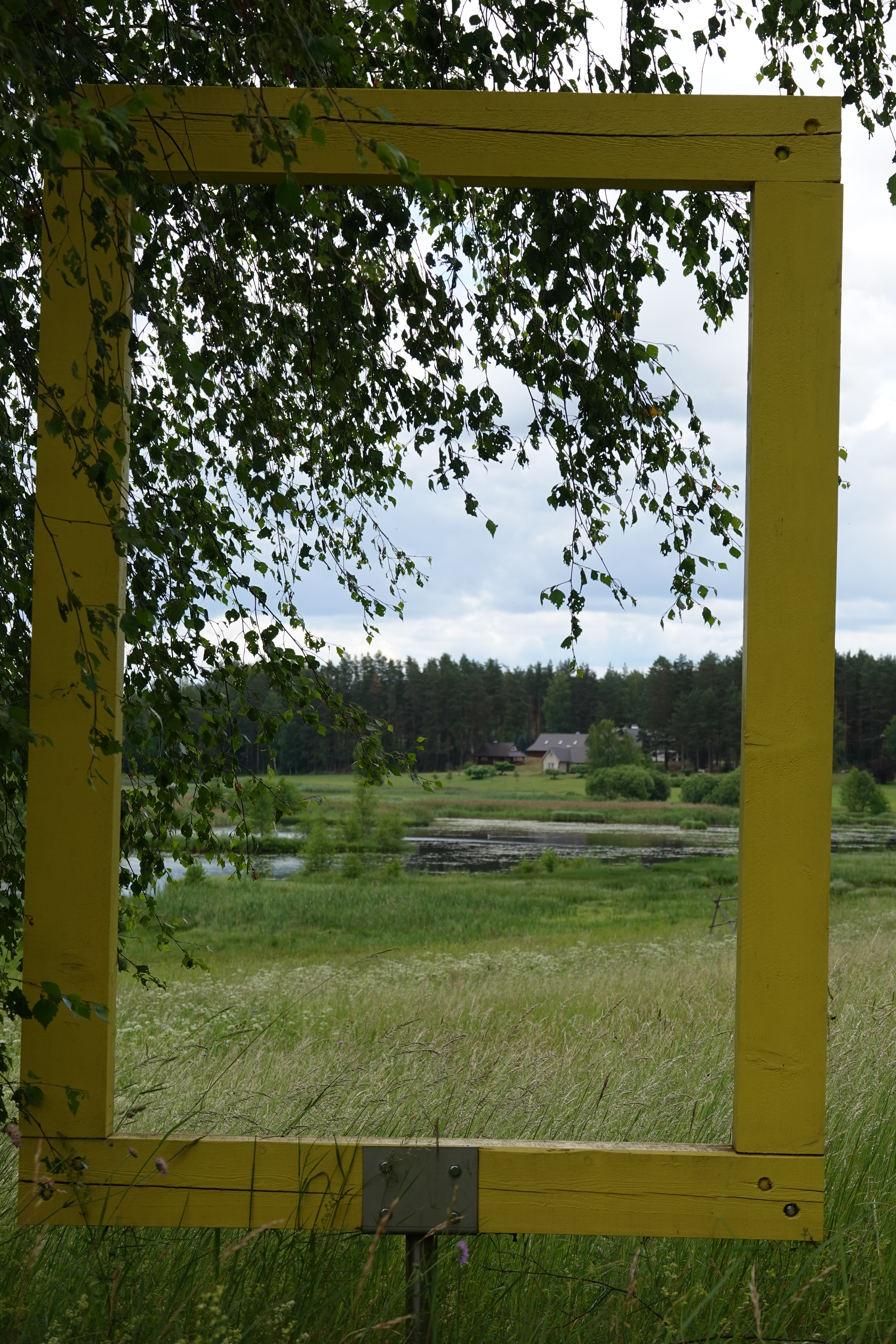
Tabina, 2024

Tabina is a village in Estonia, in Võru Parish, which belongs to Võru County.
