= Savioja, Võru Parish =

Village in Estonia

Savioja
- Village
- Location within Estonia
- Coordinates: 57°45′36″N 27°20′49″E
- Country: Estonia
- County: Võru County
- Municipality: Võru Parish

Population
  - Total: 6

Savioja is a village in Estonia, in Võru Parish, which belongs to Võru County.
