= Möldri, Võru Parish =

Village in Estonia

Möldri
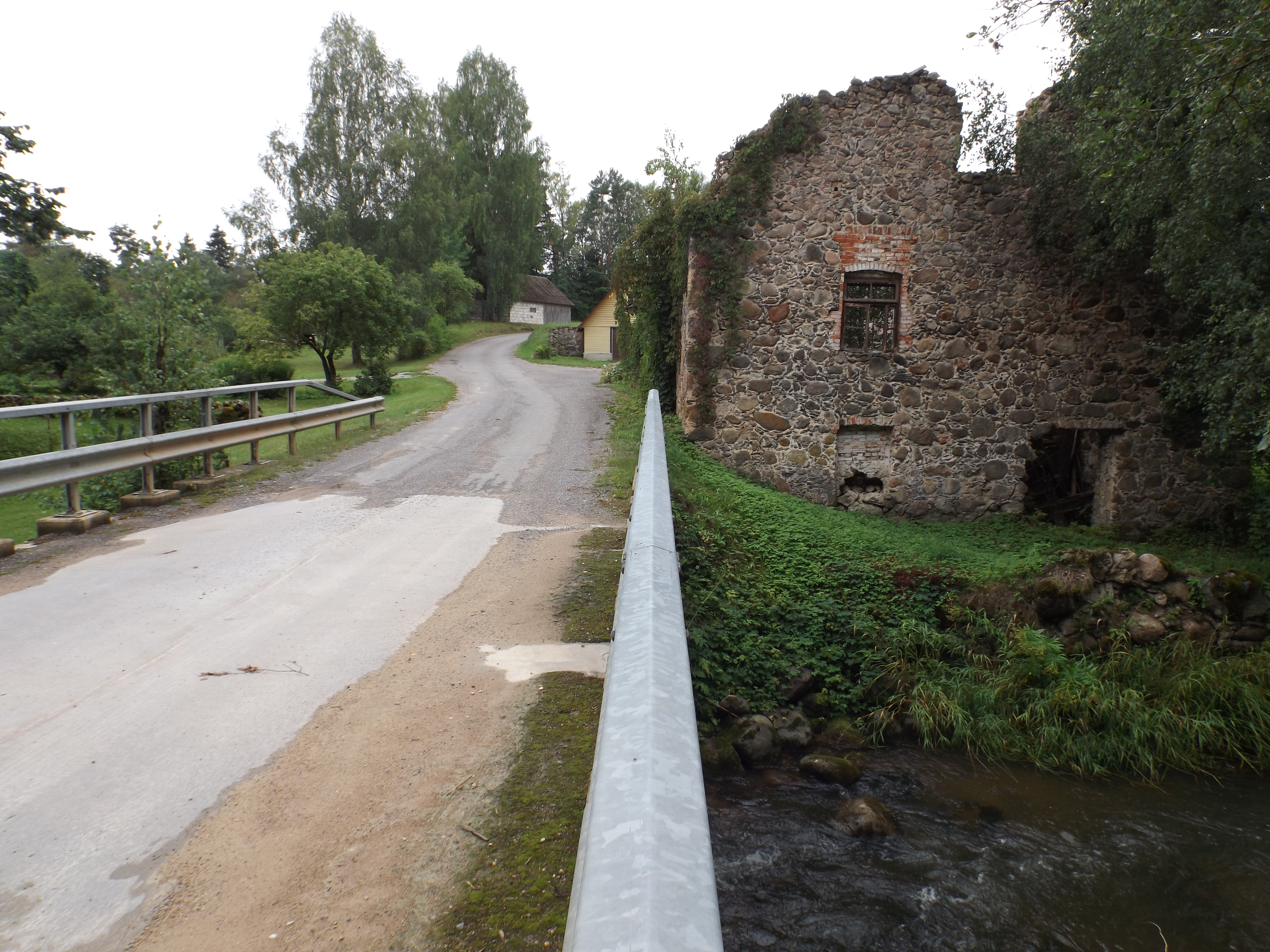
- Möldri village

- Location within Estonia
- Coordinates: 57°44′46″N 27°21′1″E
- Country: Estonia
- County: Võru County
- Time zone: UTC+2 (EET)

Möldri is a settlement in Võru Parish, Võru County in southeastern Estonia.
