= Tallinn Song Festival Grounds =

Grounds where Estonian Song Festival takes place

Coordinates: 59.444737°N 24.805670°E

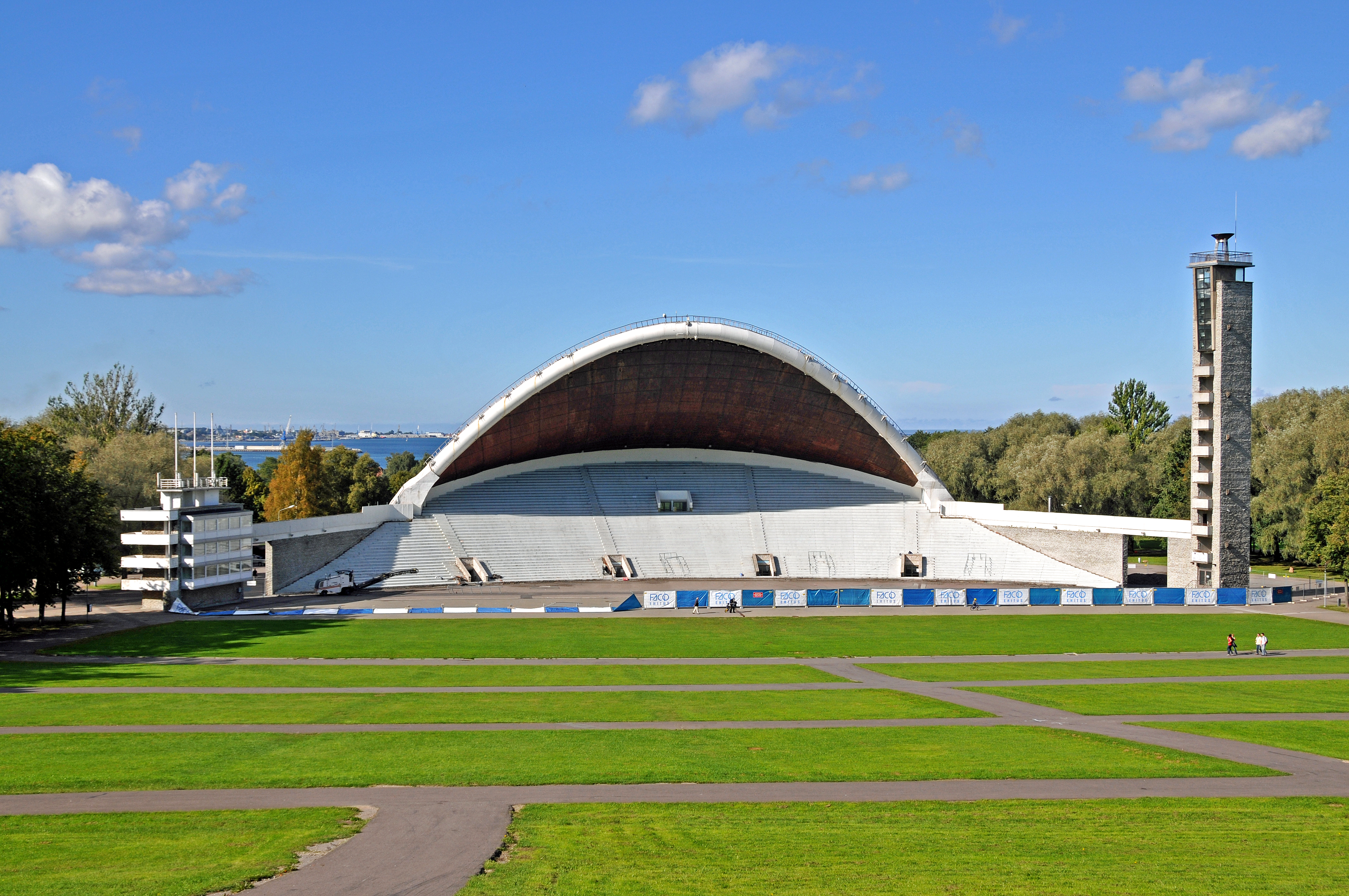
Tallinn Song Festival Grounds

The Tallinn Song Festival Grounds (Estonian: Lauluväljak) are the grounds on which the Estonian Song Festival "Laulupidu" is held every five years.

== History of song festivals ==
In 1869 Johann Voldemar Jannsen established the Estonian Song Festival while the nation was still a province of the Russian Empire. This festival was considered responsible for fostering an Estonian national awakening. After that, the new tradition was born and the festivals are still held every five years.

== Lauluväljak – The Tallinn Song Festival Grounds ==
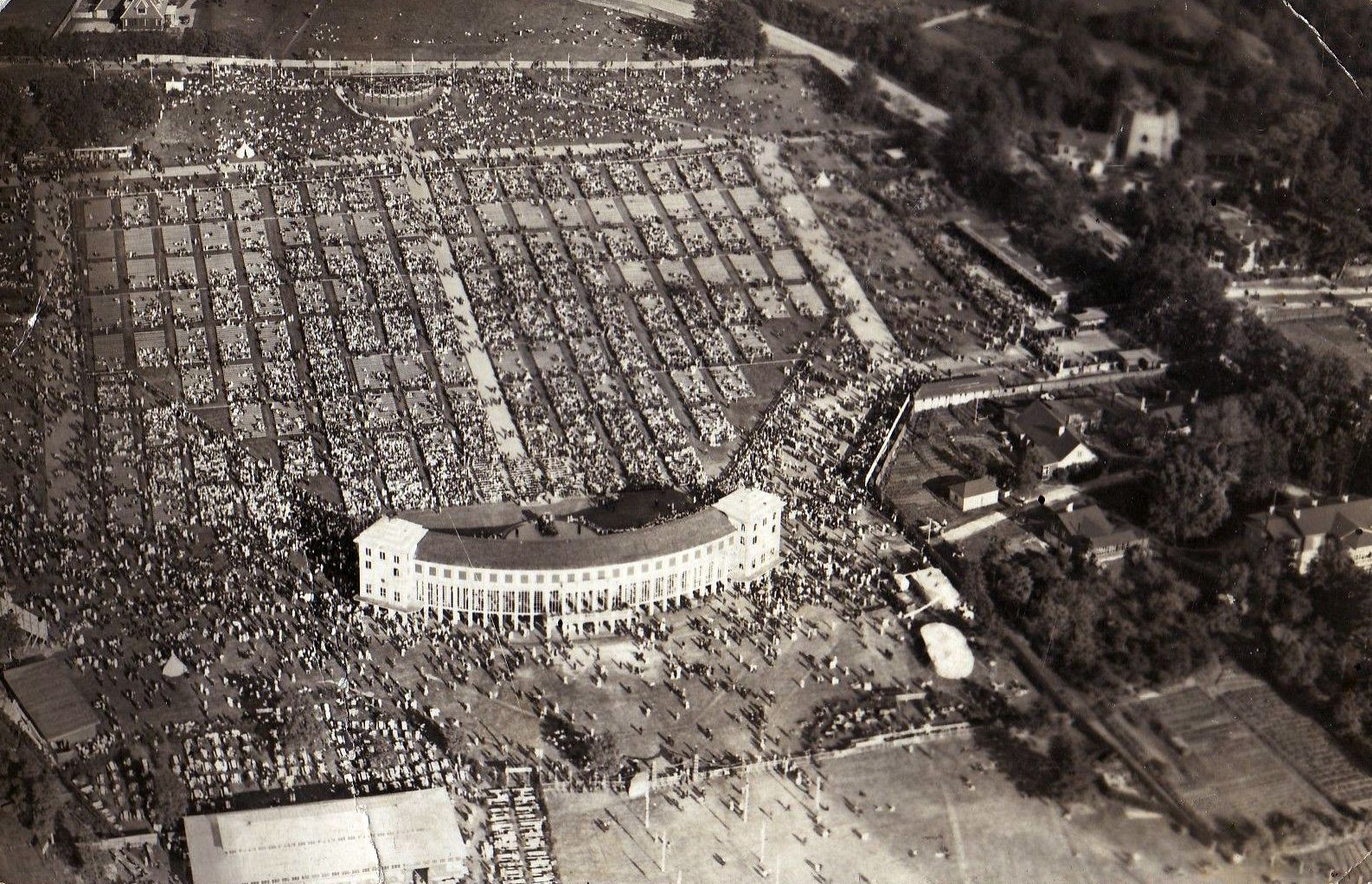
The old stage designed by Karl Burman in 1928.

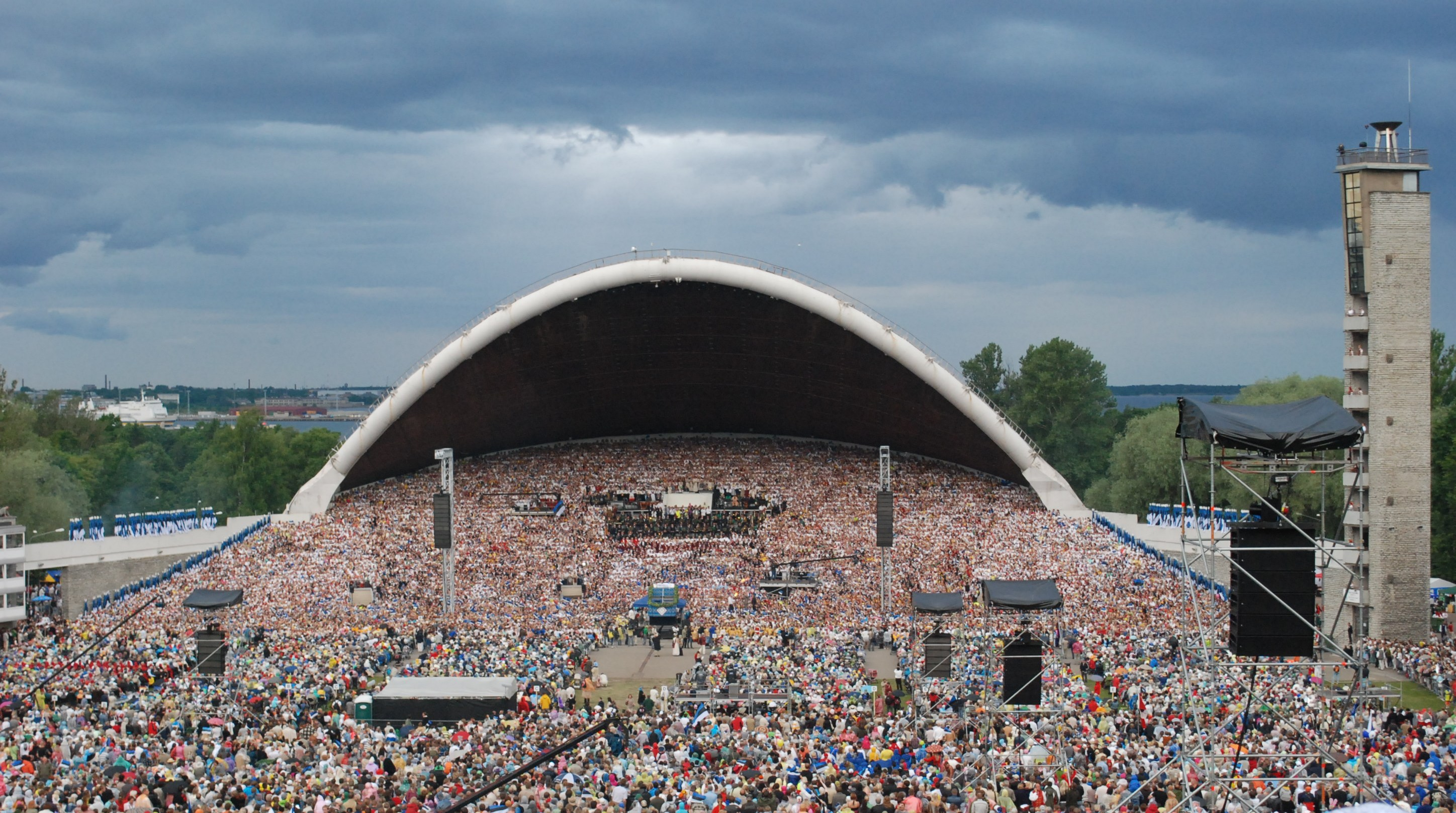
XXV Estonian Song Festival

The first stage on its current location between Narva Road and Pirita Road in Kadriorg was built in 1928 for the 9th Estonian Song Festival. It was designed by Karl Burman and provided space for 15,000 performers.

During the Occupation of Estonia by the Soviet Union, there was a need for a larger stage. The new and current arched stage was built in 1959 to celebrate the 20th anniversary of the Estonian SSR in the upcoming year. It was designed by architect Henno Sepmann together with Alar Kotli and Endel Paalmann. The 15th Estonian Song Festival in 1960 was celebrated on the new stage. The stage was meant to hold over 15,000 singers but the reverse also became possible, with the performance taking place in front of the stage and audience sitting on the stage. On the northern side of the song stage is the 42m high fire tower, which is used during the Estonian Song Festivals. It is open for the public all year long.

In 1988, Estonians gathered at the Tallinn Song Festival Grounds, to sing patriotic hymns in what became known as the Singing Revolution that led to the overthrow of Soviet rule.

Also in 1988, three years before the collapse of the Soviet Union and Estonia's reestablishment of independence, an international rock concert called the Summer of Rock (also referred to as Glasnost Rock) took place on the Tallinn Song Festival Grounds between August 26 and 28. Headlining acts included Public Image Ltd (PiL), Big Country and Steve Hackett. The concert attracted over 130,000 attendees. Rock Summer would continue each summer until 1997.

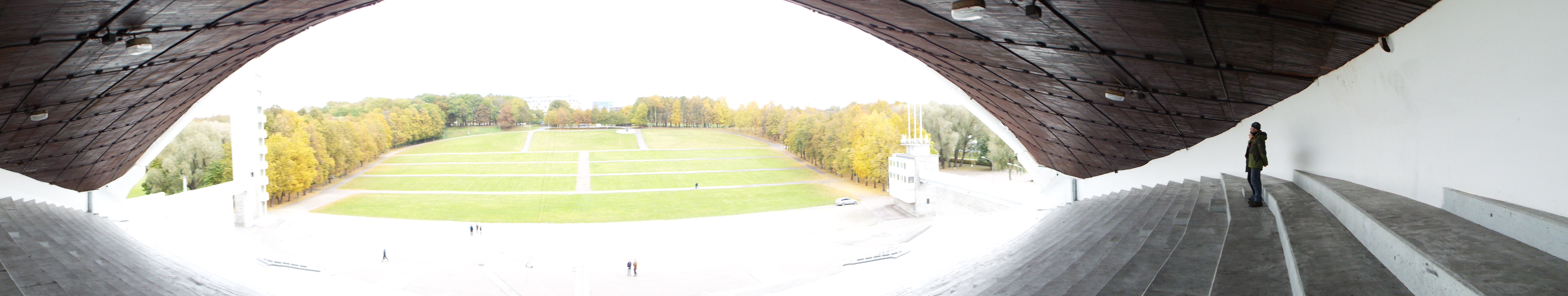
View from the stage

Today, Tallinn's Song Festival Grounds are also used for hosting international acts, such as Red Hot Chili Peppers, Michael Jackson, Tina Turner, 50 Cent, Metallica, The Rolling Stones, Elton John, Depeche Mode, Pet Shop Boys, Andrea Bocelli, Madonna, Thirty Seconds to Mars, Lady Gaga, Green Day, José Carreras, Robbie Williams and the contemporary dance music event, the Sundance Festival.

In August 2009, Madonna performed in front of a sold-out crowd of 72,067. In June 2006, Metallica gave a concert for more than 78,000 fans. In August 1997, Michael Jackson performed in front of a crowd of 85,000.

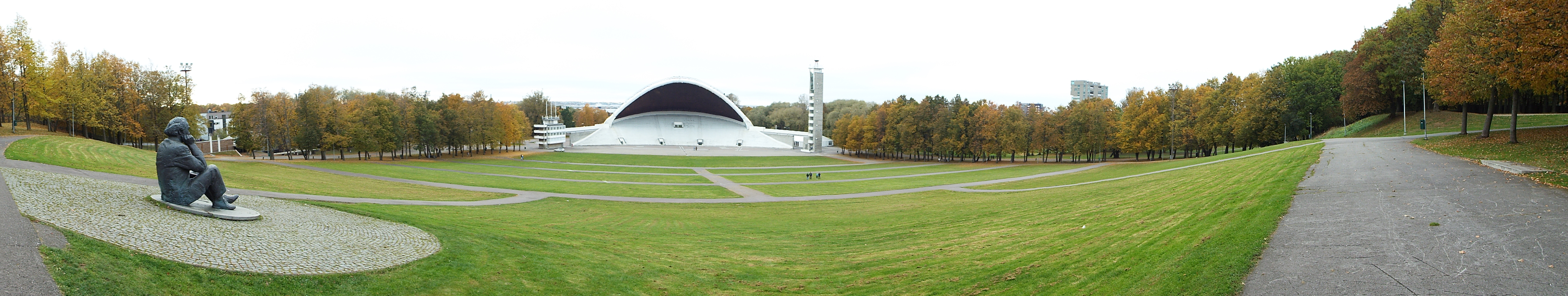
Song Festival Grounds panorama

An optimal capacity for concerts is 75,000 fans. In June 1988, during the Singing Revolution days, up to 300,000 people attended the Night Song Festival. In the years to come, however, this figure has been questioned. During the Song Festivals, when the grounds are well packed, the number of people in the audience may reach 100,000.

== Notable performers ==
- Michael Jackson performed there as part of his HIStory World Tour on August 22, 1997.
- Metallica performed there as part of their Garage Remains the Same Tour on June 29, 1999. It was their first concert in the Baltic states. They also performed on the Song Festival Grounds as part of their "Escape From The Studio '06" tour on June 13, 2006.
- Tina Turner performed there as part of her Twenty Four Seven Tour on August 12, 2000.
- Madonna performed there as part of her Sticky & Sweet Tour on August 4, 2009. It was the singer's first-ever appearance in the Baltic states as well as the 5th most attended concert on the entire world tour.
- Thirty Seconds to Mars performed there as part of their Into the Wild Tour on June 21, 2011.
- Red Hot Chili Peppers performed there as part of their tour on July 30, 2012.
- Lady Gaga performed there for 16,000 fans of the European leg of her Born This Way Ball Tour on August 25, 2012.
- Green Day performed there with their 99 Revolutions Tour on June 25, 2013.
- Elton John performed with Tallinn Star Weekend on June 29, 2013.
- Robbie Williams performed at the venue on August 20, 2013, as a part of his Take the Crown Stadium Tour. The show was broadcast live in cinemas across Europe and subsequently released on DVD and Blu-ray.
- David Guetta performed as part of the Weekend Festival on June 13, 2014.
- Queen and Adam Lambert performed there as part of their 2016 Summer Festival Tour on June 5, 2016.
- Rammstein performed there as part of their Rammstein Festival Tour on June 11, 2017, and July 20, 2022, as part of their Rammstein Stadium Tour.
- Guns N' Roses performed there as part of their Not in This Lifetime... Tour on July 16, 2018.
- Bon Jovi performed there as part of their This House Is Not for Sale Tour on June 2, 2019. It was their first concert in the Baltic states.
- Depeche Mode performed at the venue as part of their Memento Mori World Tour on August 6, 2023.
- The Weeknd performed a sold-out show as part of his After Hours til Dawn Tour on August 12, 2023. This was his first concert in the Baltic states.
- Armin Van Buuren performed there as part of the Weekend Festival on 31 August 2024.
- Imagine Dragons performed there on 3 June 2025 as part of their Loom World Tour.
- Justin Timberlake performed there on 9 June 2025 as part of his JT live 25 tour, a continuation of his The Forget Tomorrow World Tour.
- AC/DC performed there on 24 July 2025 as part of their Power Up Tour.
- 50 Cent performed there on 8 August 2025.
- Bryan Adams performed there on 14 August 2025 as part of the Roll with the Punches Tour 2025.
- David Guetta performed there on 23 August 2025.
