= Perametsa, Võru County =

Village in Estonia

Perametsa
- Location within Estonia
- Coordinates: 57°42′31″N 27°15′17″E
- Country: Estonia
- County: Võru County
- Time zone: UTC+2 (EET)

Perametsa is a settlement in Võru Parish, Võru County in southeastern Estonia.
