= Saarde, Võru County =

Village in Estonia

Saarde
- Location within Estonia
- Coordinates: 57°41′59″N 27°21′2″E
- Country: Estonia
- County: Võru County
- Time zone: UTC+2 (EET)

Saarde is a settlement in Võru Parish, Võru County in southeastern Estonia.
