= Paloveere, Võru Parish =

Village in Estonia

Paloveere
- Location within Estonia
- Coordinates: 57°43′42″N 27°10′2″E
- Country: Estonia
- County: Võru County
- Time zone: UTC+2 (EET)

Paloveere is a settlement in Võru Parish, Võru County in southeastern Estonia.
