= Tsolli, Võru Parish =

Village in Estonia

Tsolli
- Location within Estonia
- Coordinates: 57°45′8″N 27°14′37″E
- Country: Estonia
- County: Võru County
- Time zone: UTC+2 (EET)

Tsolli is a settlement in Võru Parish, Võru County in southeastern Estonia.
