= Kurtna, Harju County =

Village in Estonia

Coordinates: 59°13′44″N 24°45′03″E

Kurtna
- Village
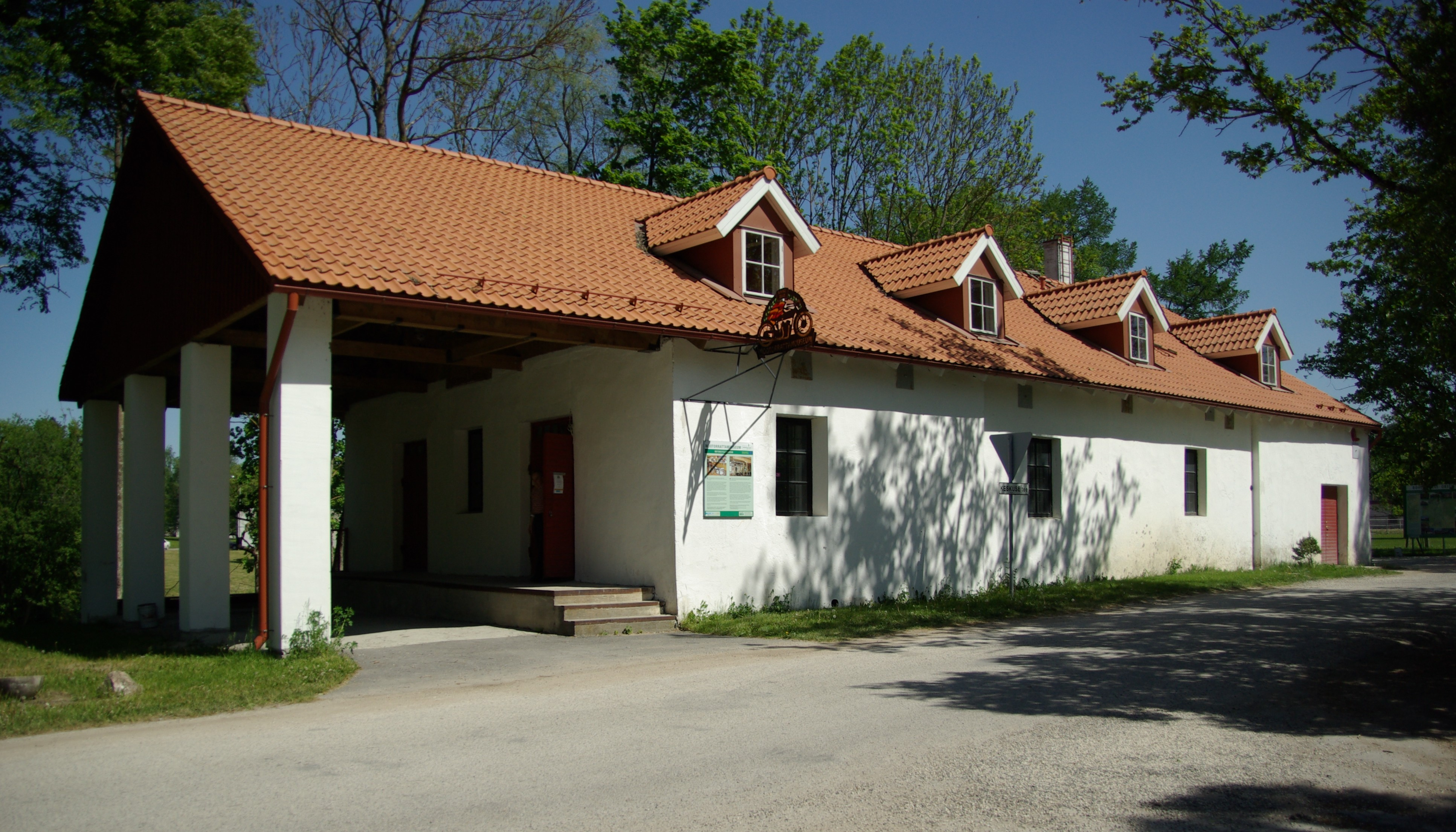
- Kurtna Motorcycle Museum
- Interactive map of Kurtna
- Country: Estonia
- County: Harju County
- Parish: Saku Parish
- Time zone: UTC+2 (EET)
  - Summer (DST): UTC+3 (EEST)

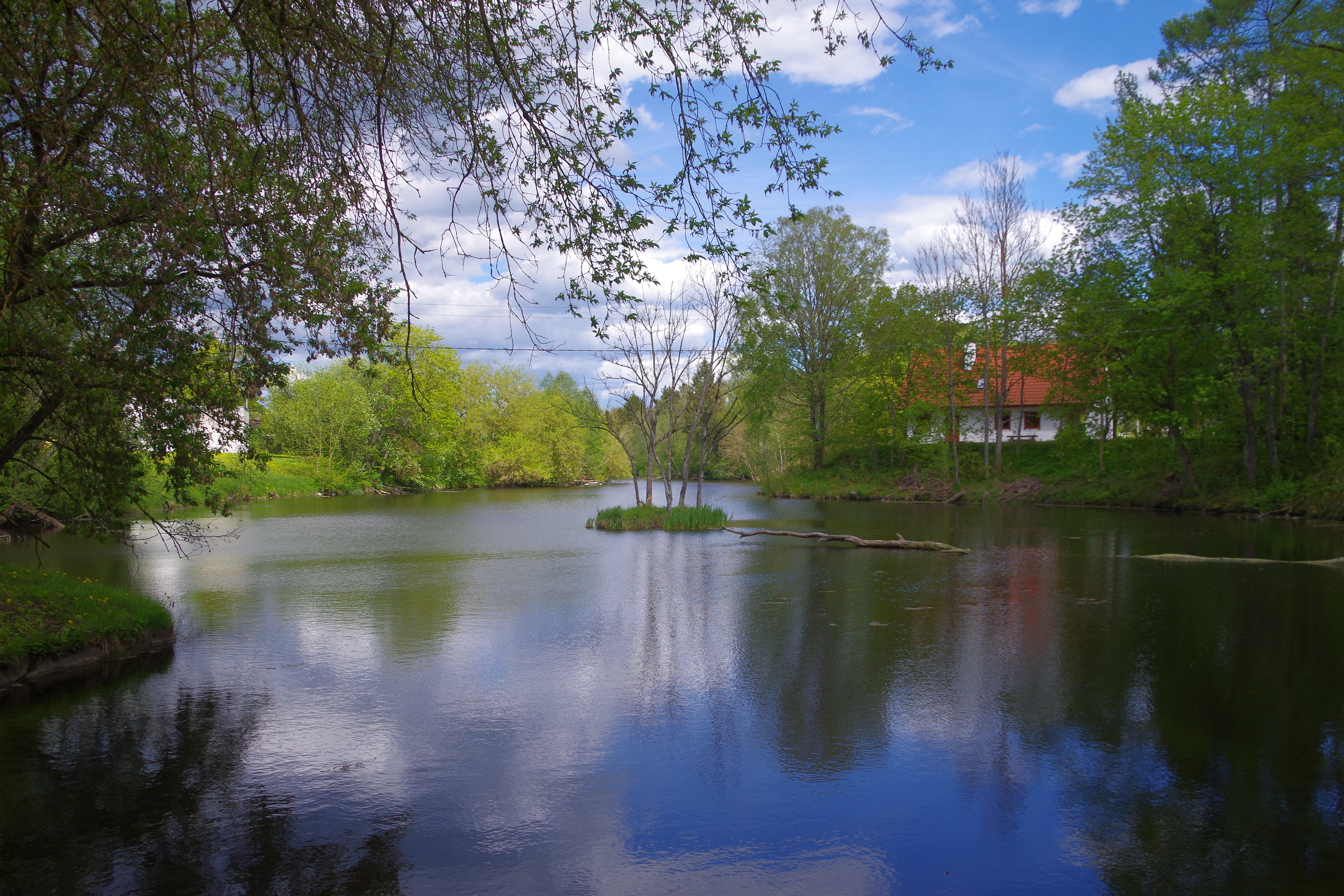
Kurtna reservoir

Kurtna is a village in Saku Parish, Harju County in northern Estonia.

== Sport ==
Kurtna is home to Estonian Bandy Association:
