= Väino Tamm =

Estonian interior designer (1930–1986)

Väino Tamm (8 August 1930–26 June 1986) was an Estonian interior designer and vice associate professor of the State Art Institute of the Estonian SSR (ERKI, now Estonian Academy of Arts, EKA) from 1959, where he was also the Interior Design Department manager from 1968 to 1986. In the 1960s he became one of the most recognizable spatial designers in Estonia, changing that profession to deal with interior design rather than just simply decorating a space, especially emphasising the impact of a room's atmosphere on a person. His work is characterized by the influences of rigorous and minimalist Nordic modernism, the new architectural trends which dealt with the functionality, restraint of form, and overall effect of space in interior architecture layout. In 1967 he was declared an Estonian SSR respected architect.

== Education and career ==
Tamm was born in Tallinn and lived in Järvamaa, where his mother Erna was a teacher and his father Gustav was an agronomist. He attended Ambla, Alatskivi, and Reola primary schools between 1938 and 1944, and then Tapa High School from 1945 to 1949. From 1949 to 1955 Tamm studied interior design at ERKI where he graduated cum laude in 1955. One of his classmates at Tapa High School was Teddy Böckler, who also graduated from the ERKI interior design department with Tamm in 1955 and later became known as an architect and architectural historian.

Tamm started his working life as an interior designer designing the interiors and furniture at the Hotel Park in Tartu in the 1950s, and from 1958 to 1959 he worked as an economist at the Puit furniture factory. From 1955 to 1958 he was a professor at Tartu School of Fine Arts (later Tartu Art School) until becoming a locum professor at ERKI in 1959, a position he held until 1970 when he became an associate professor. He was also head of the interior design department at ERKI from 1968 until his death in 1986.

Tamm was a member of the Union of Architects in Estonia from 1958, and in 1967 he was declared an Estonian SSR respected architect.

== Influences and style ==
Before becoming the head of the Interior Design Department at ERKI, Tamm was a trainee from 1967 to 1968 at Helsinki University of Technology (now Aalto University) in Finland, where his tutor was the head of the Fine Arts Department, Seppo Paatero. After he finished his trainee period he wrote a detailed report on the study of interior design in Finland, describing the programs, resources, exercises, and learning conditions, particularly with regard to the furniture in schools, the sources of interior design and projecting, and interior fittings. He actively took part in studies and was a tutor to students, also earning some extra money and getting familiar with practical training by working in the architectural offices of Kristi and Erkki Helamaa. Stylistically, Tamm's internship mostly consolidated his earlier beliefs, synthesizing and developing them. After this Finnish period there is no radical change in his work, and his interior design and furniture for the Kurtna poultry farming house – one of the most important objects of modern architecture – was completed just before his stay in Finland.

Tamm prioritised functionality throughout his work, with his influence leading to spatial design in Estonia becoming interior architecture. As a mentor for subjects related to furniture design and construction at ERKI he launched a strong school of space and furniture designing, the so-called Tamme School, which promoted the functional direction of modernism as his approach to space shifted from details to more general effects.

He also introduced an innovative design culture into interior design, using a black and white graphic bubble that showed perspective views of space rather than the watercolor technique previously used to visualize projects, and he used drawings the size of a postcard rather than the regular A1 size. Tamm also introduced the tradition of students designing a stool and chair in their first course, an innovation which lasted for almost 50 years.

== Works ==
=== Tallinn Pegasus cafe ===
Together with Leila Pärtelpoeg and Allan Murdmaa, Tamm was responsible for the ascetic design of the interiors of the Tallinn Pegasus Cafe in 1963. The youthfulness of the interior design was distinctly different to those of other cafes at that time, and so the Pegasus became an important place for the birth of culture and an overall cultural scene in itself.

The cafe was spread out over three floors, with the first floor a wardrobe and the second and third floors dining rooms. On top of the spiral staircase connecting the three floors was Estonia's first abstract cafe sculpture, Edgar Viiese's "Pegasus", made out of polished aluminium. The simple and spacious effect of the interior was achieved by a large curtain-less window on one wall overlooking the St. Nicholas Church and Harju Street's green area, facing onto the white and spacious room without separated areas or partitions. The gray plastered walls bore conical wall lamps placed in geometric regularity with their light directed towards the wall and reflected from it, giving a mild and enchanting impression.

Alvar Aalto curved veneer furniture was also an influence on the cafe's furniture design, and the Pegasus chairs played a very important role in the history of Estonian furniture. They comprised two dark painted plywood boards placed apart from each other and bent over a heavy iron structure at a small angle, with a metal clip on the upper fifth of the back of the chair holding the two veneers together.

=== Old Town cafes ===
Working with various collaborators, Tamm also initiated more laconic interior designs in three other Tallinn restaurants during the 1960s: Cafe Gloria (1963, with L. Pärtelpoja and A. Murdmaaga); Cafe Tallinn (1967–69, with Vello Asi); and Bar Karoliina (1968, with V. Asi). The unique design of these Old Town cafés became an indicator of changing furnishing trends through their radical reorganizing of features retained from previous times together with elements referring to history. The Cafe Tallinn – and its confectionery products – were famous all over the city. Cafe Gloria's most impressive feature was its big hall with live music, with a special look given to it by a suspended ceiling made out of laminate slabs with angular lamps. The interior of Cafe Karoliina had the most historic aura, with the exhibition wall, arched ceiling, and tables made out of the trunks of ancient trees. One wall expressed the modernity of the room with some square lamps mounted close to the floor, creating a mystical glow with a spotlight on the wall.

In Cafe Tallinn the original custom-made chairs were replaced with authentic Vienna chairs bent from beechwood that had survived the fire at the University of Tartu, complemented by small square tables with rounded legs. These chairs fitted perfectly in an Old Town interior because of their historical cafe-chair image, but a modern look was created by a horizontally positioned decorative deck covering one wall with minimalist clothes racks. Both the variety ceiling on the second floor of the Cafe Tallinn and the wine shelf of the Cafe Karoliina bar were formed by welding together empty bottomless cups from the fish compound.

=== Kurtna poultry test station ===
The interior of the Kurtna poultry test station (1967, together with V. Asi, Soviet Estonian Award 1967) appears as a reverse of the exterior with some repetitive materials and forms. The opposite direction of the lines arising from the combination of benches, brick walls, and longitudinal wood beam ceilings is emphasized, and the furniture also leaves an architectural impression. Similarly to Tuljak, the ceiling is studded with rounded copper lamp globes in straight lines, with a Nordic effect given by the close-to-nature materials of wood, copper, brick, and glass. However the most important element shaping the room is light, with that from the gradual ceiling giving the room a sacral expression. An abstract metal sculpture made by Riho Kuld also stood in the hall.

The building won the Soviet Estonian Prize in 1967 and became a major object of admiration and a destination for excursions. Today the main building has become a hotel, but the original finishing materials for the hall and lobby interiors have been preserved and the fireplace furniture has been restored.

=== Vanemuine Theater ===
Tamm first started planning the interiors of the Vanemuine Theater with Leila Pärtelpoeg but completed it with Vello Asi, who joined the project when Tamm was in Finland. Officially, the project was recorded as done by Tamm alone, although several books published in the 1960s and 1970s mention Vello Asi as Tamm's collaborator. The materials for the 700-seat Vanemuine Theater hall were chosen on acoustic calculations, with the large acoustic contrast of the room arising from a light floor, artificial marble-covered walls, and black furniture above a curved plastered ceiling.

=== Hotel Viru ===
The Hotel Viru in Tallinn was one of the most controversial new buildings in Estonia's 20th-century architecture, with the entire plan of the hotel being one of the most illustrious examples of the 1970s international style in Estonia. The hotel lounges, restaurant, and varieties were designed by Tamm (1970–72, with V. Asi and Loomet Raudsepp, Soviet Estonia Prize 1972), with the laconicism of the interior reminiscent of the Japanese traditional design of space, particularly expressed by an empty hall that contained only some necessary furniture. Another example of this style was the design for Arne Jacobsen's unbuilt Copenhagen Radisson SAS Hotel, with its designed ashtrays and tableware in an interior architecture created on an even level.

=== Other work ===
in 1975, Tamm solved the reconstruction of the Estonia Theatre by taking into consideration the existing design. His last work, the interiors of Pirita's sailing center, were completed in 1980 with Vello Asi, Leo Leesaar, Juta Lember and Aulo Padar.

Over the years Tamm published articles on space design, mainly in the almanac Kunst ja Kodu.

Tamm collaborated with Vello Asi for nearly thirty years, during which time they completed several important objects and educated young interior designers.

== Personal life ==
Tamm was married to Leelo-Helgi Tamm, a philologist, and they had two children: Pille Lausmäe (born 23 April, 1958) who was also an interior architect and mother of the interior architect Ville Lausmäe; and Kalevi Tamm.

Tamm is buried in Metsakalmistu.

== List of projects ==
- Hotel Park furniture and partial decor, Tartu, 1955
- Furniture design for serial production at the Puit factory, 1956
- Own house in Aegviidu, 1957–69
- Architectural solution of the monument for the victims of fascism, Tartu, 1958 (completed in 1964, sculptor E. Rebane)
- Furniture at the Furniture Exhibition of the Baltic Republics, 1959
- Interior design of the Tartu University School Club, Tartu, 1959
- Interior design and furniture of the Tartu Department of the Soviet Estonian Art Foundation, 1959
- Tartu State University Kääriku Sports Base Main Building and Dormitory interior design and furniture, 1960
- Kohtla-Järve Café interior design, 1962
- Interior design of the Club of Creative Alliances (Art Club or KUKU Club), 1963 (co-author A. Murdmaa)
- Cafe International interior design and furniture, Moscow, 1963 (not completed)
- Hotel International design and furniture, Moscow, 1963 (co-author A. Murdmaa) (not completed)
- Cafe Pegasus interior design and furniture, Tallinn, 1963 (co-authors L. Pärtelpoeg, A. Murdmaa)
- Tallinn Hotel interior design and furniture sets, 1963 (co-author A. Murdmaa)
- Restaurant Gloria interior design, Tallinn, 1963 (co-authors L. Pärtelpoeg and A. Murdmaa)
- Interior design and auditorium furniture of the new study building at TPI, Tallinn, 1964 (co-author L. Pärtelpoeg)
- USSR Writers' Club, Moscow, 1964 (co-author A. Murdmaa)
- Cafe Moscow, Tallinn, 1965 (co-author H. Karro)
- Furniture in Pärnu Theater Hall, 1965-67 (co-author V. Asi)
- Interior design and furniture of Vanemuine Theater and Concert Hall, Tartu, 1965–67, 1970 (started with L. Pärtelpoja, co-author V. Asi)
- Furniture for the Estonian SSR reception room and partial décor of the Council of Ministers, 1965
- Interior design and furniture sketch for the office of the Ministry of Culture (Estonian SSR), 1966
- Interior design and furniture sketches for the offices of the Ministry of Construction, 1966
- Interior design of the offices of the Estonian SSR State Literature Committee, 1966
- Interior design of the new building of the Estonian Academy of Arts, 1966-1967 (co-authors V. Asi, L. Pärtelpoeg)
- Café Tuljak interior design and furniture, Tallinn, 1966 (co-author V. Asi)
- Design and furniture of the main building of the Kurtna Poultry Testing Station, 1967 (co-author V. Asi)
- Cafe Tallinn, Tallinn, 1967-69 (co-author V. Asi)
- Bar Karolina, Tallinn, 1968 (co-author V. Asi)
- Hotel Viru Interiors, Tallinn, 1968-72 (co-authors V. Asi, Taevo Gans, Mait Summatavet and L.Raudsepp)
- Interior design of the Estonian Radio Administrative Building, Tallinn, 1970 (main author A.-H. Õun)
- Interior design and furniture of the Republican Clinical Hospital Conference Hall, Tallinn, 1972
- Theater Estonia, 1973 (co-author V. Asi)
- Interior Design Project of the USSR Art Foundation's Export salon, 1975 (co-author V. Asi)
- Interior design of the Pirita Marine Center Yacht Club and Press Center, Tallinn, 1975-80 (co-authors V. Asi, L. Leesar, J. Lember and A. Padar)
- Theater Vanemuine Small House interior design, Tartu, 1975
- Interiors of the Presidium of the Hunting Society, Tallinn, 1981 (co-author V. Asi)
- The study building of ERKI's room and furniture design department, Nooruse 11 (now known as Suur-Kloostri), Tallinn, 1983-84 (co-authors V. Asi and L.Leesaar)

== Book Designs ==
- A. Siig, Vaikuse tähtkuju, Eesti Raamat 1973
- A. Siig, Murdeajastu, Eesti Raamat 1976
- Cover designs of the almanac Kunst ja Kodu: 3/1960, 2/1963, 1/1966

== Contests and national awards ==
- 1954 2nd Prize of the Republican Furniture of the Standard Furniture
- 1958 All-Union Furniture Competition 2nd Prize
- 1960 1st prize at the ETKVL Cafeteria and Restaurants furniture competition
- 1967 Estonian SSR respected architect
- 1967 Soviet Estonia Prize for the main building of the Kurtna Poultry Experimental Station (co-author V. Asi)
- 1970 Medal for Excellent Work
- 1972 The Soviet Estonia Prize in the Hotel Viru designers' team
- 1980 Annual Prize at the Artists Union designers section for the Pirita Sailing Center
