= Henno Sepmann =

Estonian architect (1925–1985)

Henno Sepmann (12 February 1925 Tartu – 24 September 1985 Moscow) was an Estonian architect.

In 1952, he graduated from Tallinn Polytechnical Institute. Since 1952, he worked at the architectural bureau "Eesti Projekt". He was married to landscape architect Valve Pormeister.

Awards:

- 1973: Estonian SSR merited architect

== Works ==
- 1960: Tallinn Song Festival Grounds (co-architect)
- 1972: Viru Hotel (co-architect)
