= Tuderna =

Village in Estonia

Tuderna Tudõrna (in Võro)
- village
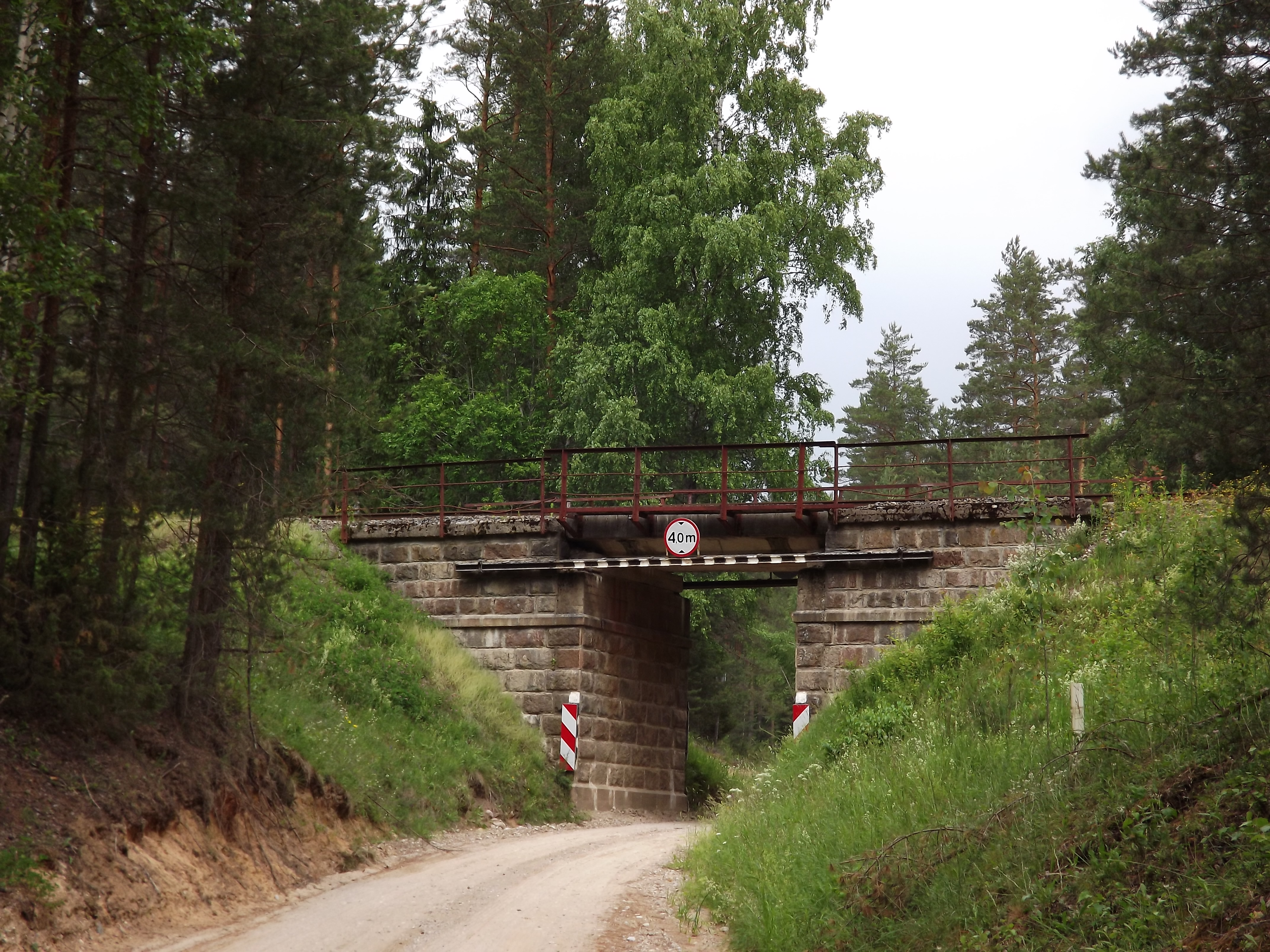
- Tuderna railway bridge at the Hanikase-Tamme road

- Location in Estonia
- Coordinates: 57°50′33″N 27°24′52″E
- Country: Estonia
- County: Võru County
- Municipality: Võru Parish

Tuderna (Võro: Tudõrna) is a village in Võru Parish, Võru County, in southeastern Estonia. It is located on the left bank of Piusa River between Soena and Piusa villages. Prior to the 2017 administrative reform of local governments, it was located in Orava Parish.

Tuderna has a station on currently inactive Valga–Pechory railway.
