= Võmmorski =

Village in Estonia

- village
- Location in Estonia
- Coordinates: 57°49′49″N 27°32′14″E
- Country: Estonia
- County: Võru County
- Municipality: Setomaa Parish

Population (2000)
  - Total: 43

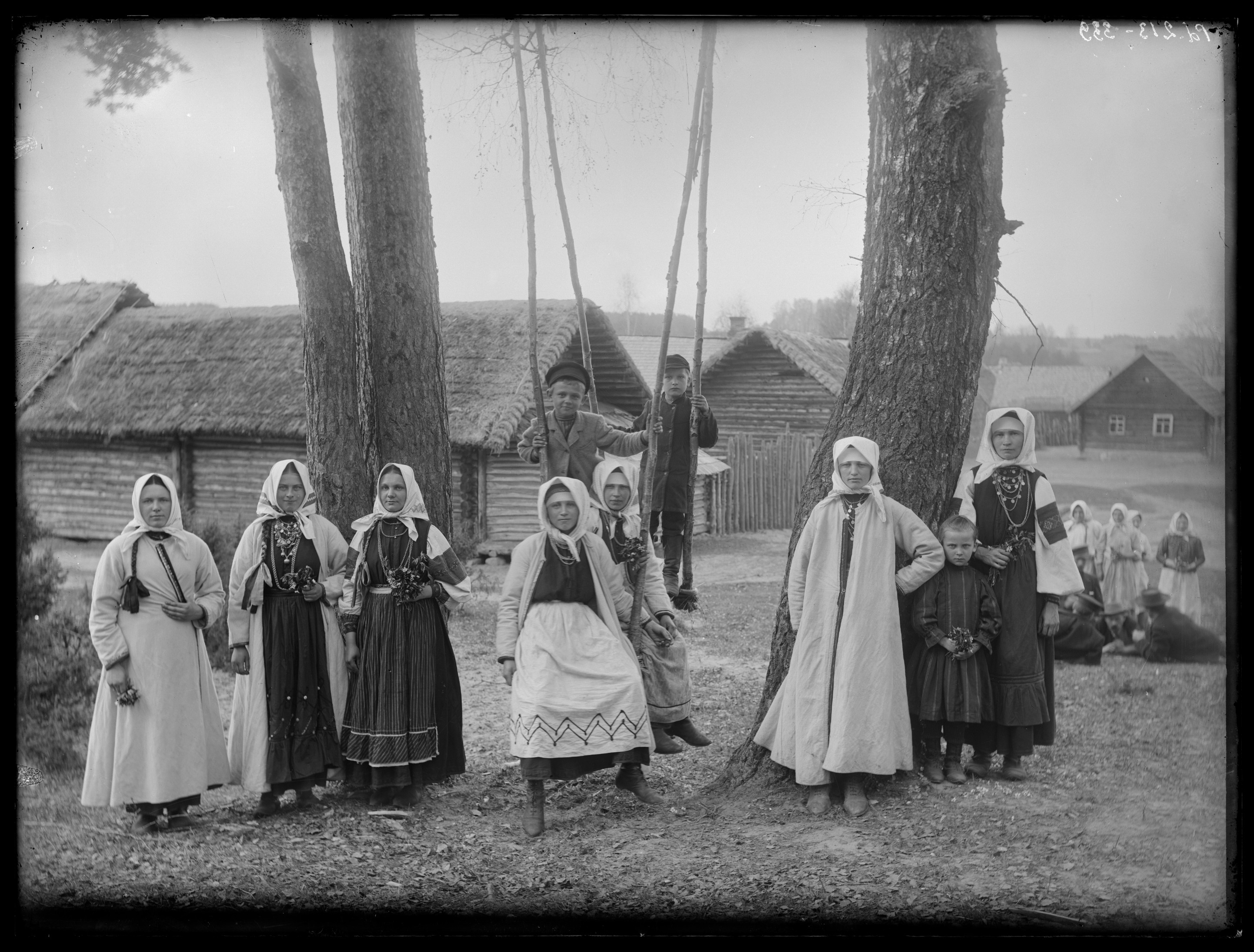
Võmmorski village, 1913

Võmmorski is a village in Setomaa Parish, Võru County, in southeastern Estonia, on the border with Russia. The Piusa River borders the village in the north, Russian border in the east. As of 2000, Võmmorski had a population of 43.

Old Võmmorski Chapel, a small Seto chapel, is located in the village.

The Piusa cordon of the Estonian Border Guard is located in Võmmorski.

On 4 May 2011 a shooting incident between police officers and local landowner took place just behind the river on the territory of the village of Piusa. As a result the landowner and a police officer died and two were wounded.
