= Soe =

Soe or Søe may refer to:

== Places ==
- Soe, Timor, a city in Indonesia
- Soe, Võru County, a village in Võru Parish, Võru County, Estonia
- Soe, Viljandi County, a village in Viljandi Parish, Viljandi County, Estonia
- Soé River, a river in Paraíba, Brazil

== People ==
- Aung Soe (1924–1990), Burmese painter
- Jeppe Søe (born 1971), Danish politician and journalist
- Naw Susanna Hla Hla Soe (born 1965), Karen politician, social activist, and zoologist
- Soe Hok Gie (1942–1969), Indonesian journalist and activist
- Soe Myat Min (born 1982), Burmese football player
- Soe Win (1947–2007), Burmese politician
- Thakin Soe (1906–1989), Burmese politician

== See also ==
- SOE (disambiguation)
- Soen
