= Mikitamäe Parish =

Former municipality of Estonia

Coordinates: 58°0′15″N 27°32′34″E

Mikitamäe Parish Mikitamäe vald
- Former municipality of Estonia
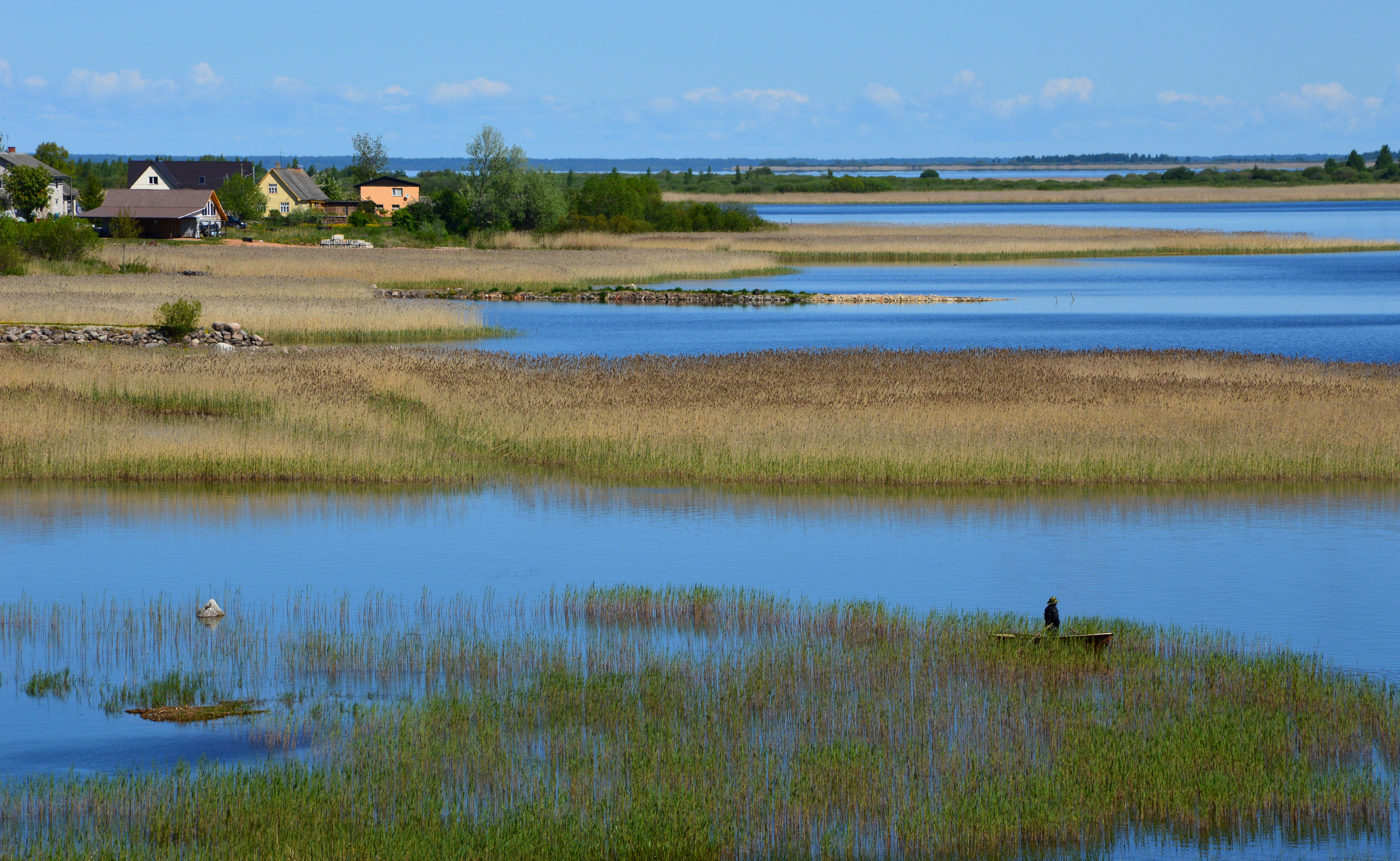
- The village of Lüübnitsa

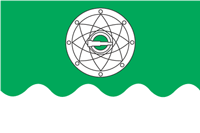
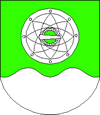
- Flag Coat of arms

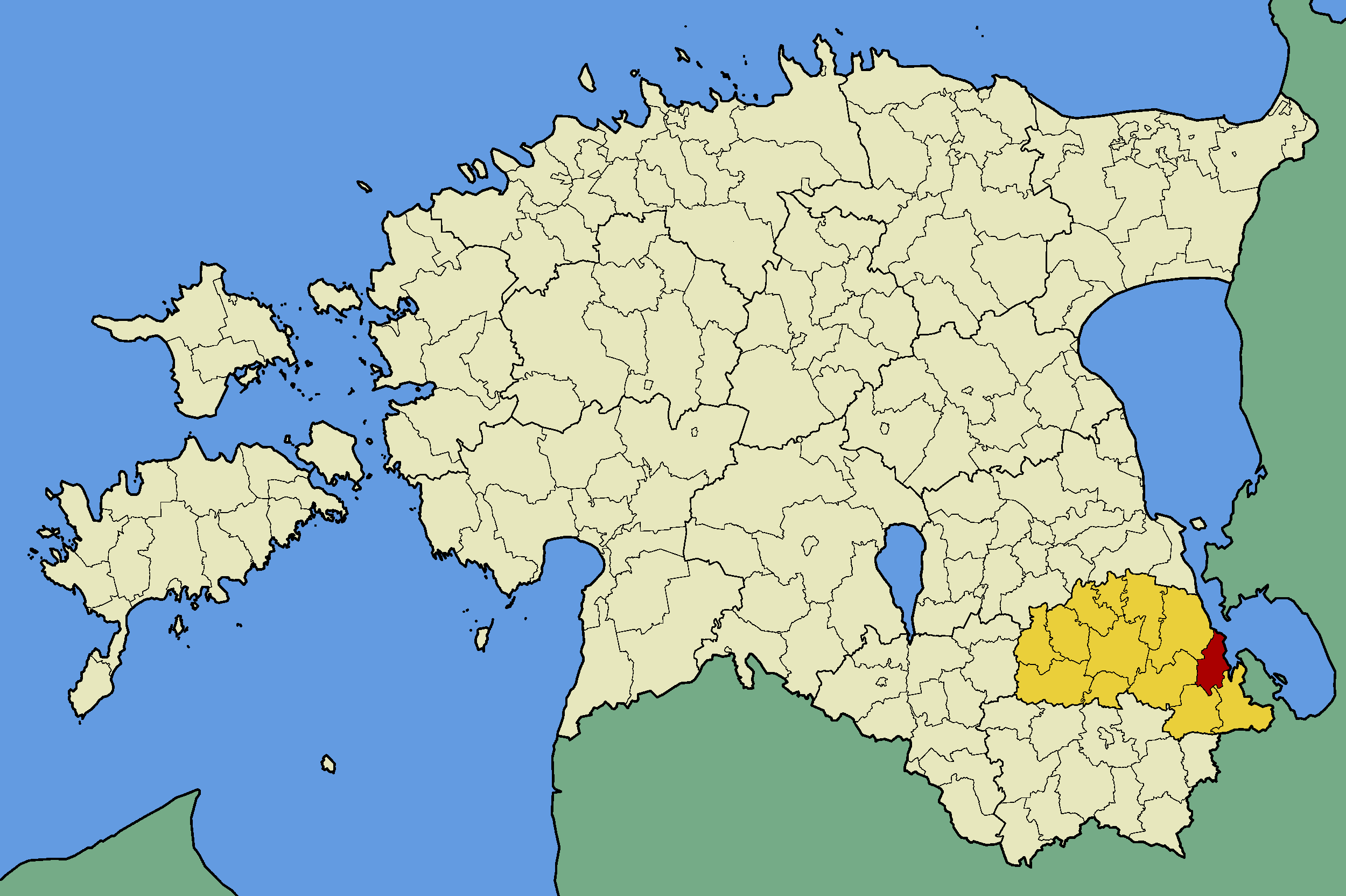
- Mikitamäe Parish within Põlva County.
- Country: Estonia
- County: Põlva County
- Administrative centre: Mikitamäe

Area
  - Total: 104.41 km^{2} (40.31 sq mi)

Population (01.01.2009)
  - Total: 998
  - Density: 9.56/km^{2} (24.8/sq mi)
- Website: www.mikitamae.ee

Mikitamäe Parish (Estonian: Mikitamäe vald) was a rural municipality of Estonia, in Põlva County. It had a population of 998 (as of 1 January 2009) and an area of 104.41 km².

== Settlements ==
Villages

Audjassaare - Beresje - Igrise - Järvepää - Kahkva - Karisilla - Laossina - Lüübnitsa - Mikitamäe - Niitsiku - Puugnitsa - Rääsolaane - Rõsna - Selise - Toomasmäe - Usinitsa - Varesmäe - Võõpsu

== People ==
The Estonian stage actress and singer Olli Ungvere (1906–1991) was born in Mikitamäe Parish.

== Gallery ==
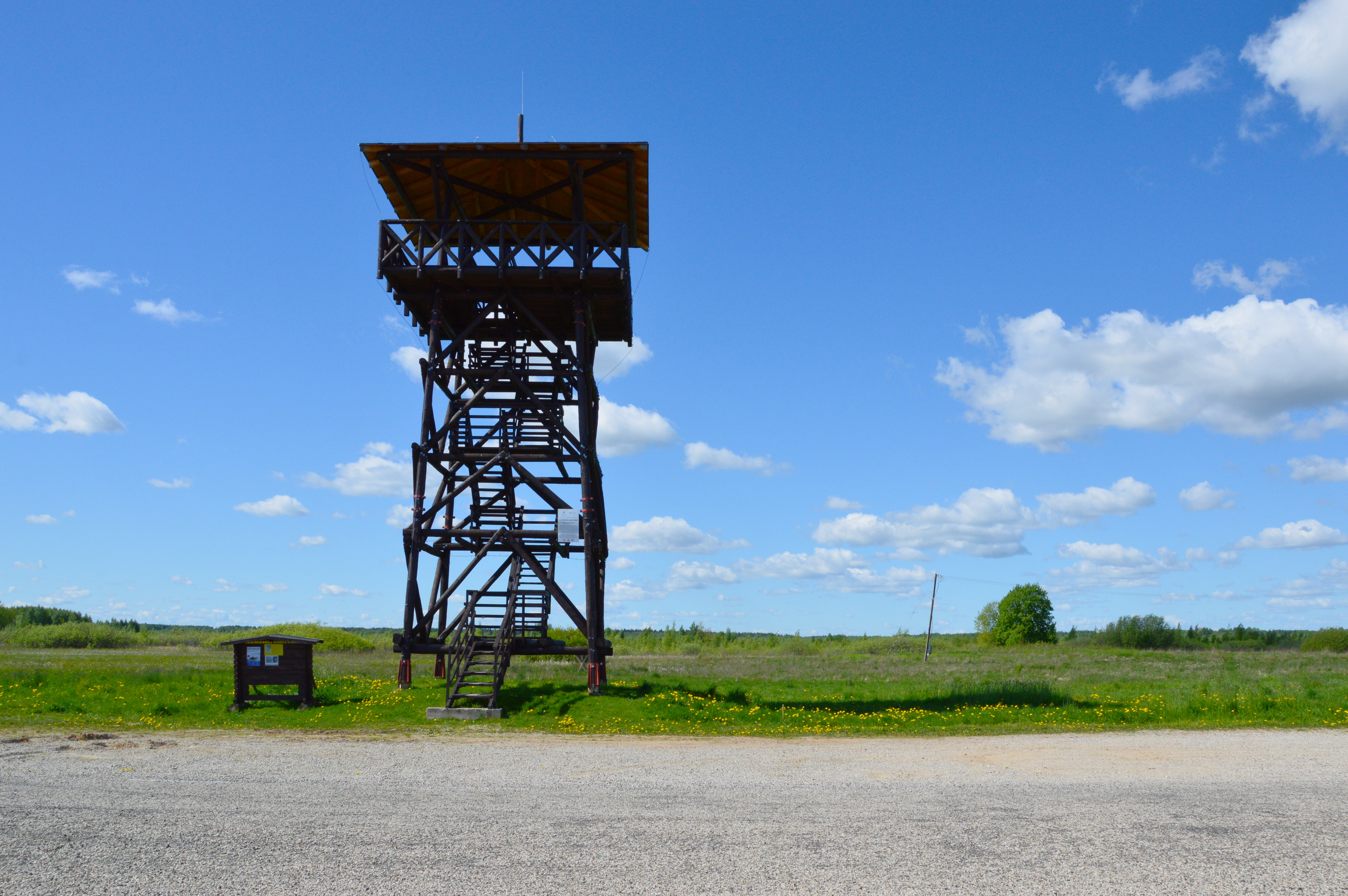
Lüübnitsa watchtower next to Lake Pihkva

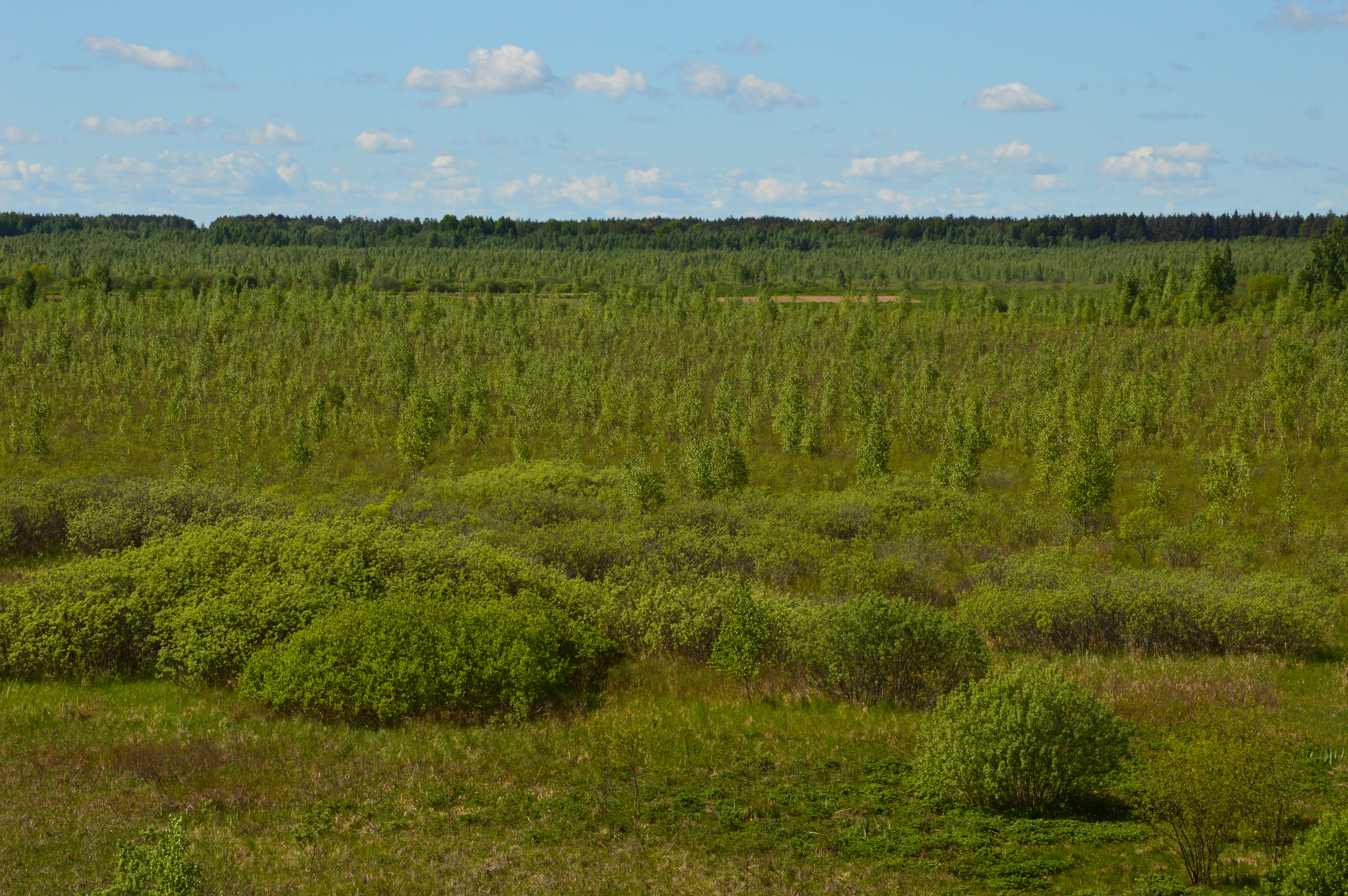
Lüübnitsa conservation area

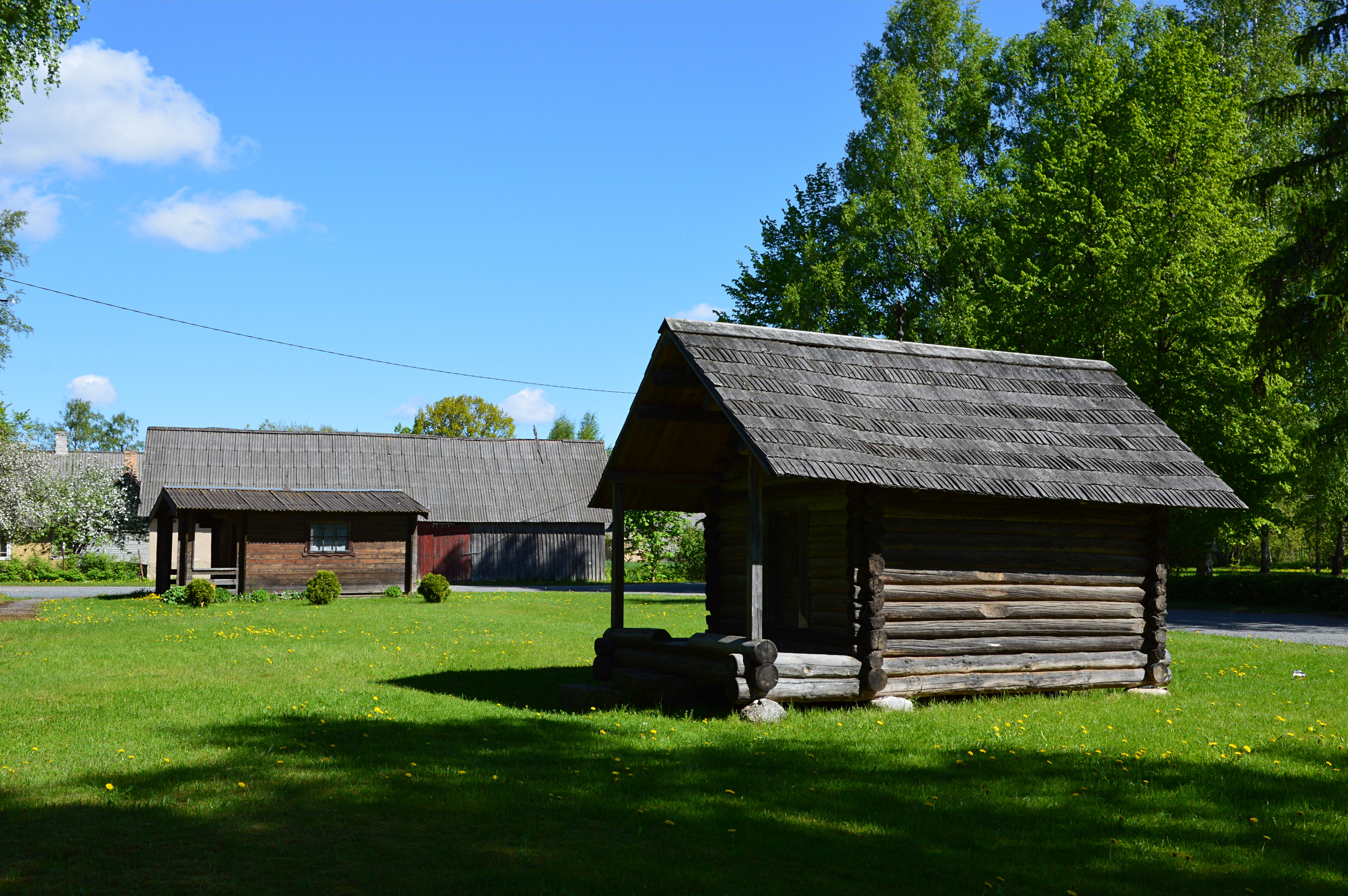
Mikitamäe village chapels. The one in front is thought to be built somewhere around 1694
