= SOES =

SOES or SOEs may stand for:

- Small Order Execution System (SOES), a former system to facilitate clearing trades of low volume on Nasdaq
- State-owned enterprises (SOEs)

== See also ==
- SOE (disambiguation)
