= Piusa River Hiking Trail =

Trail in Estonia

Coordinates: 57°47′39″N 27°21′48″E

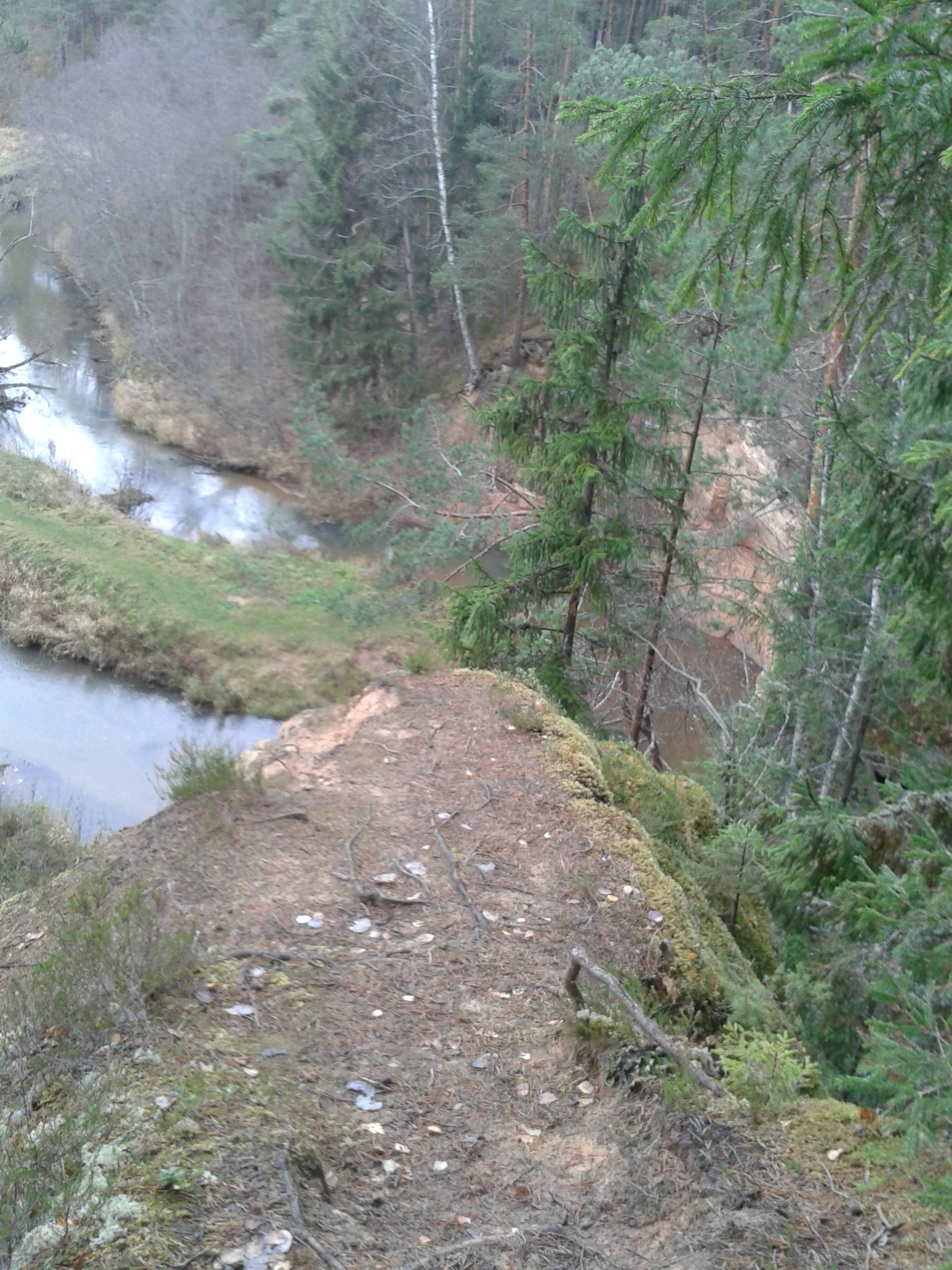
The Piusa River

The Piusa River Hiking Trail (Estonian: Piusa ürgoru matkarada) is a hiking trail in southeastern Estonia. The trail, managed by RMK (the State Forest Management Centre), is a 15 km route past the ruins of Vastseliina Castle along the valley of the Piusa River up to the village of Lindora. The trail is marked by wooden signposts and information boards about the sights. There are two campfire sites on the trail supplied with grills for cooking and with the possibility of camping. There are two picnic tables with shelters and a dry toilet. The hiking trail is in the Piusa River Valley Landscape Protection Area. Among the most interesting sights on the trail are castle ruins, sandstone outcrops—the Härma Mäemine Wall or Keldri Wall (the highest sandstone outcrop in Estonia), and the Härma Alumine Wall or Keldri Wall–and several old mill sites. There are a total of 12 sandstone outcrops along the hiking trail.
