= Rebasmäe =

Village in Estonia

Coordinates: 57°56′48″N 27°25′13″E

- Village
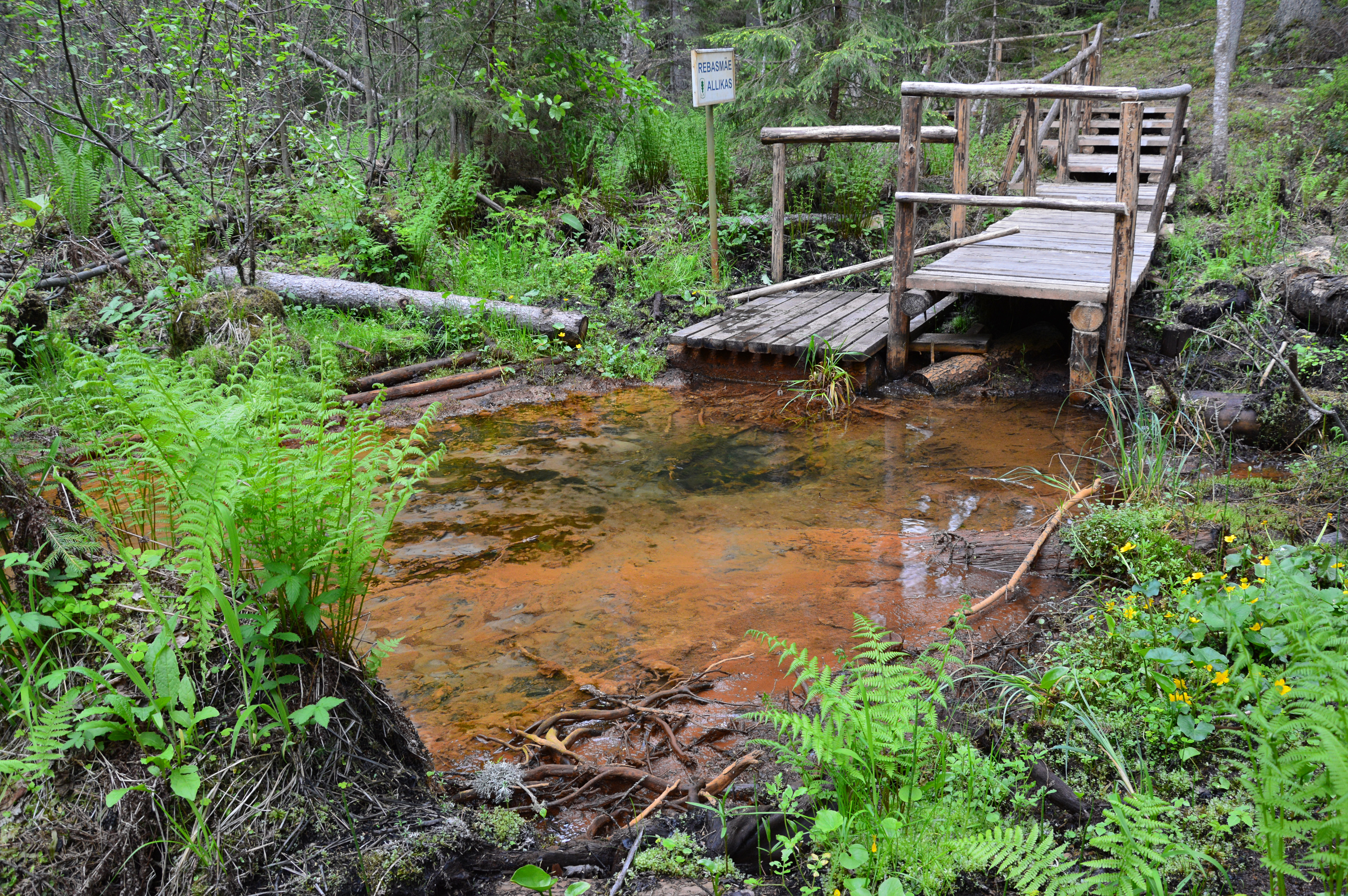
- Rebasmäe spring
- Interactive map of Rebasmäe
- Country: Estonia
- County: Võru County
- Parish: Võru Parish
- Time zone: UTC+2 (EET)
  - Summer (DST): UTC+3 (EEST)

Rebasmäe is a village in Võru Parish, Võru County in southeastern Estonia. Prior to the 2017 administrative reform of local governments, it was located in Orava Parish.

Rebasmäe has Ilumetsa impact craters. Two of the largest are known as Põrguhaud ja Sügavhaud.

There is also a Rebasmäe Spring.
