= Piusa River Valley Landscape Conservation Area =

Protected area in Estonia

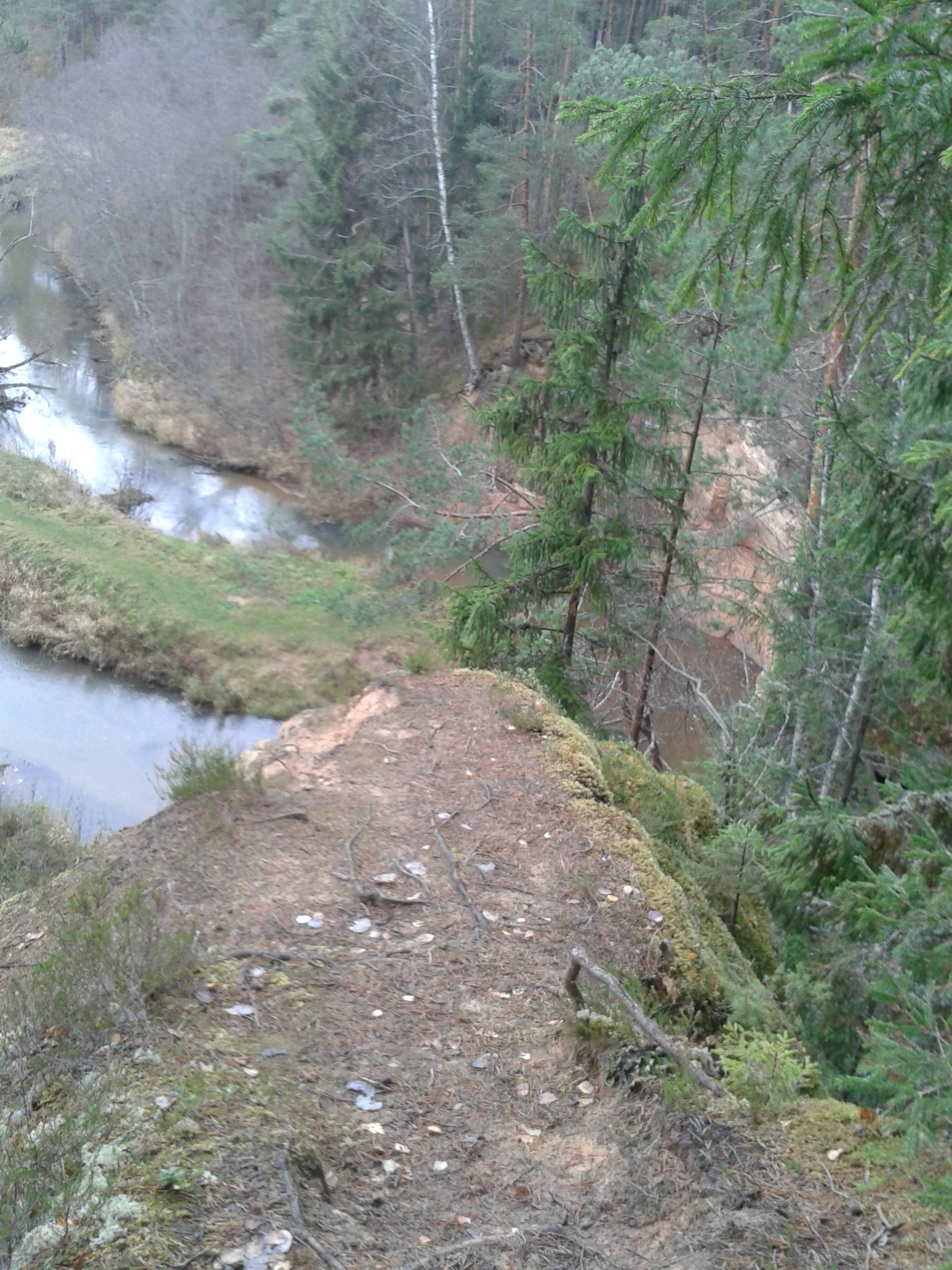

- Location within Estonia
- Location: Estonia
- Coordinates: 57°47′N 27°22′E
- Area: 1,212 ha (2,990 acres)
- Established: 1962 (2005)

Piusa River Valley Landscape Conservation Area is a nature park which is located in Võru County, Estonia.

The area of the nature park is 1212 ha.

The protected area was founded in 1962 to protect Piusa River's valley.
