= Orava Parish =

Former municipality of Estonia

Coordinates: 57°53′14″N 27°27′29″E

Orava Parish Orava vald
- Former municipality of Estonia
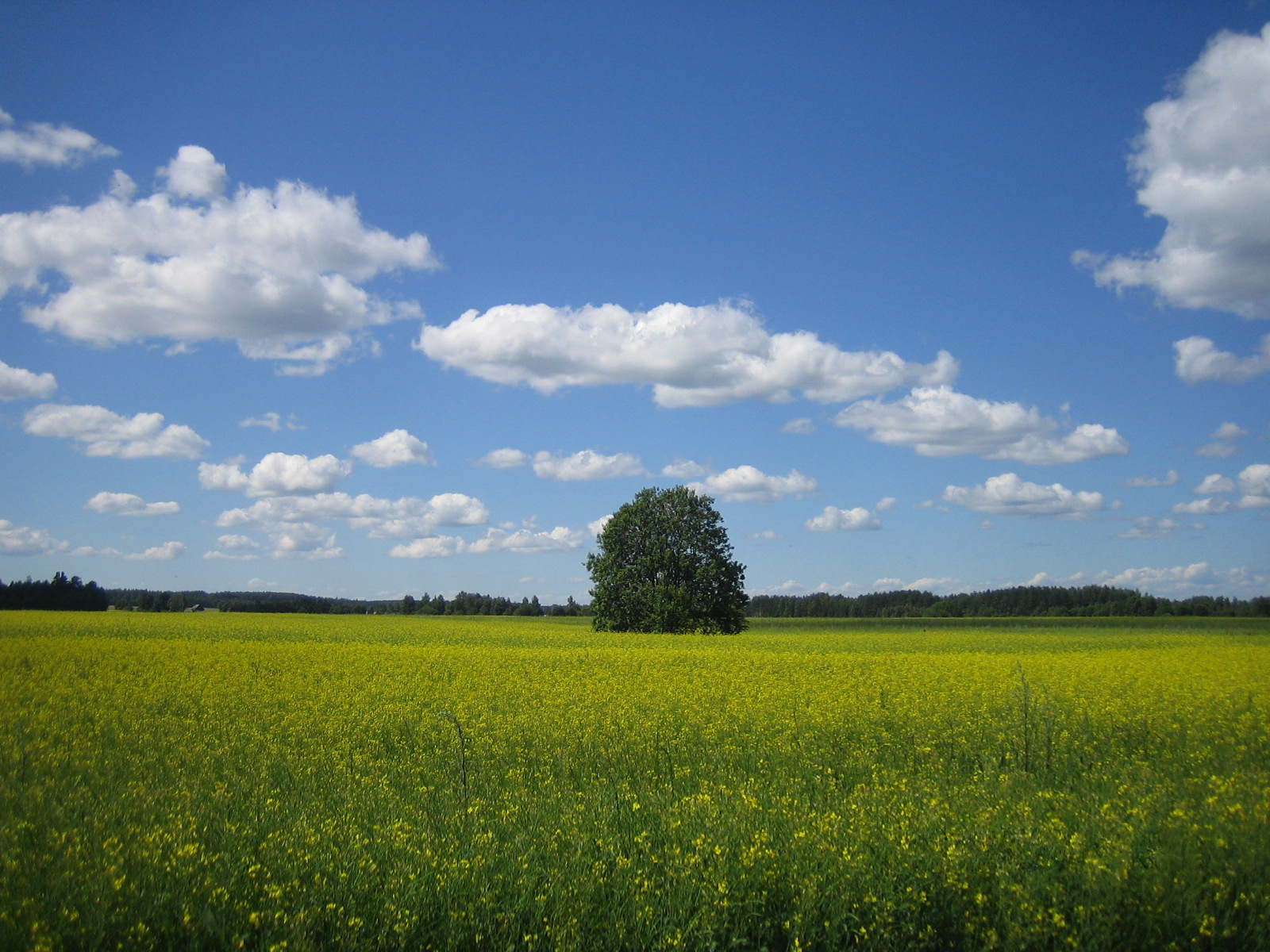
- Parish countryside

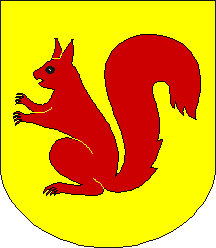
- Flag Coat of arms

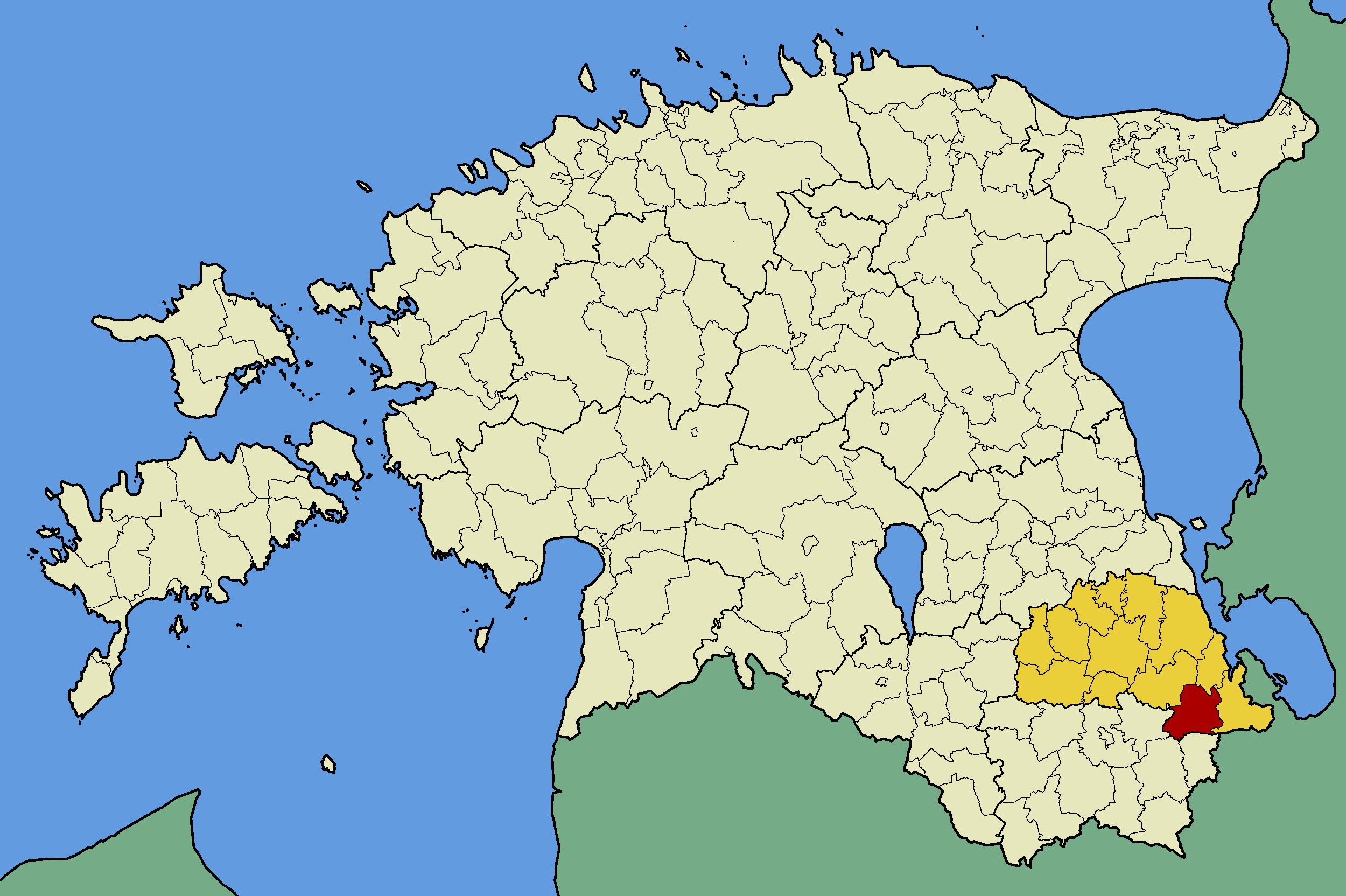
- Orava Parish within Põlva County.
- Country: Estonia
- County: Põlva County
- Administrative centre: Orava

Area
  - Total: 175.6 km^{2} (67.8 sq mi)

Population (2008)
  - Total: 854
  - Density: 4.86/km^{2} (12.6/sq mi)
- Website: www.orava.ee

Orava Parish (Estonian: Orava vald) was a rural municipality in south-eastern Estonia, Põlva County. The municipality had a population of 854 (as of 1 January 2008) and covered an area of 175.52 km². The population density was 4.9 inhabitants per km².

== Villages ==
There were a total of 30 villages in Orava Parish. Administrative centre of the municipality was Orava village. Other villages were Hanikase, Jantra, Kahkva, Kakusuu, Kamnitsa, Kliima, Korgõmõisa, Kõivsaare, Kõliküla, Kõvera, Lepassaare, Liinamäe, Luuska, Madi, Marga, Oro, Piusa, Praakmani, Päka, Pääväkese, Rebasmäe, Riihora, Rõssa, Soe, Soena, Suuremetsa, Tamme, Tuderna and Vivva.

== Gallery ==
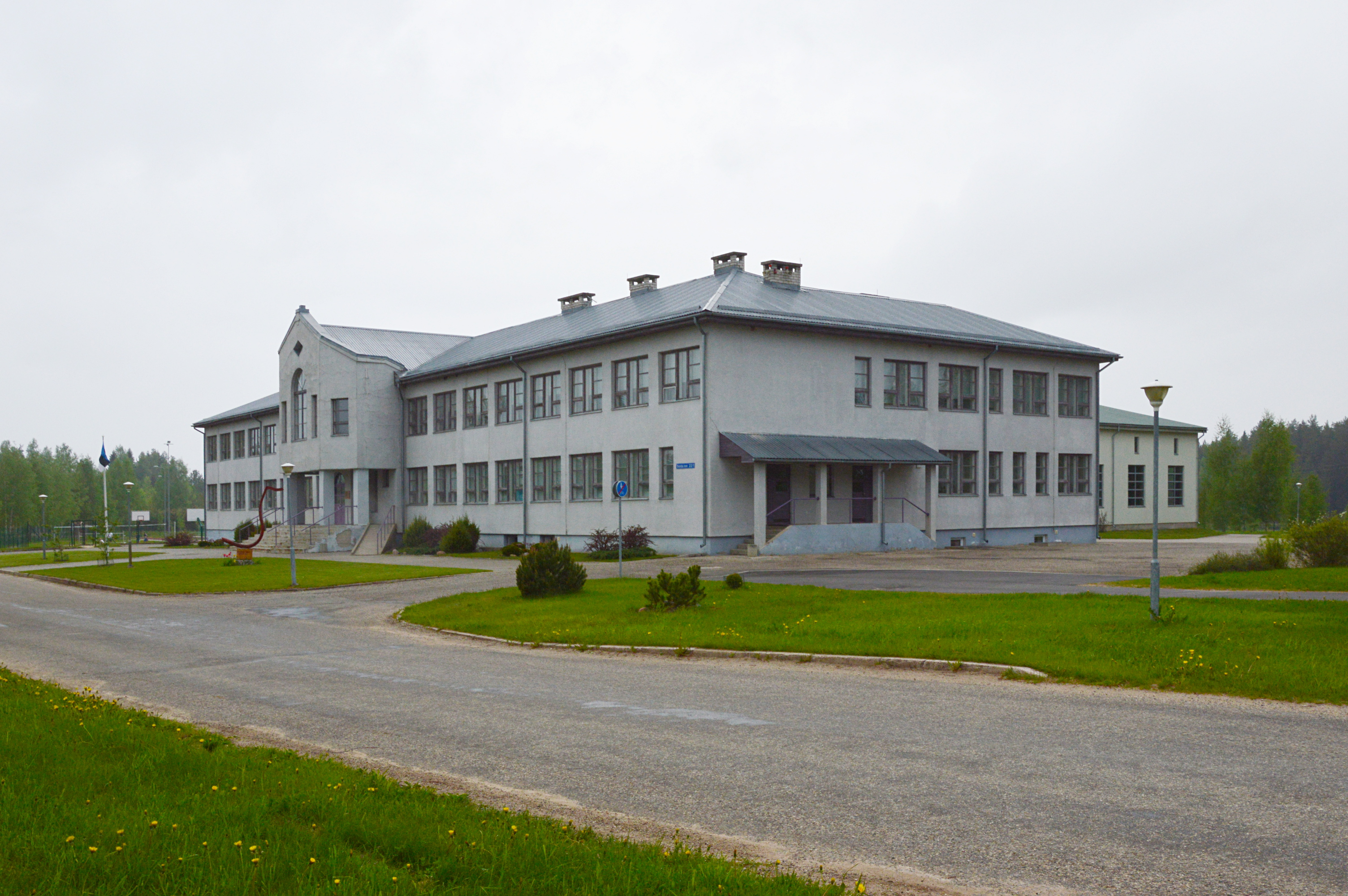
Orava school

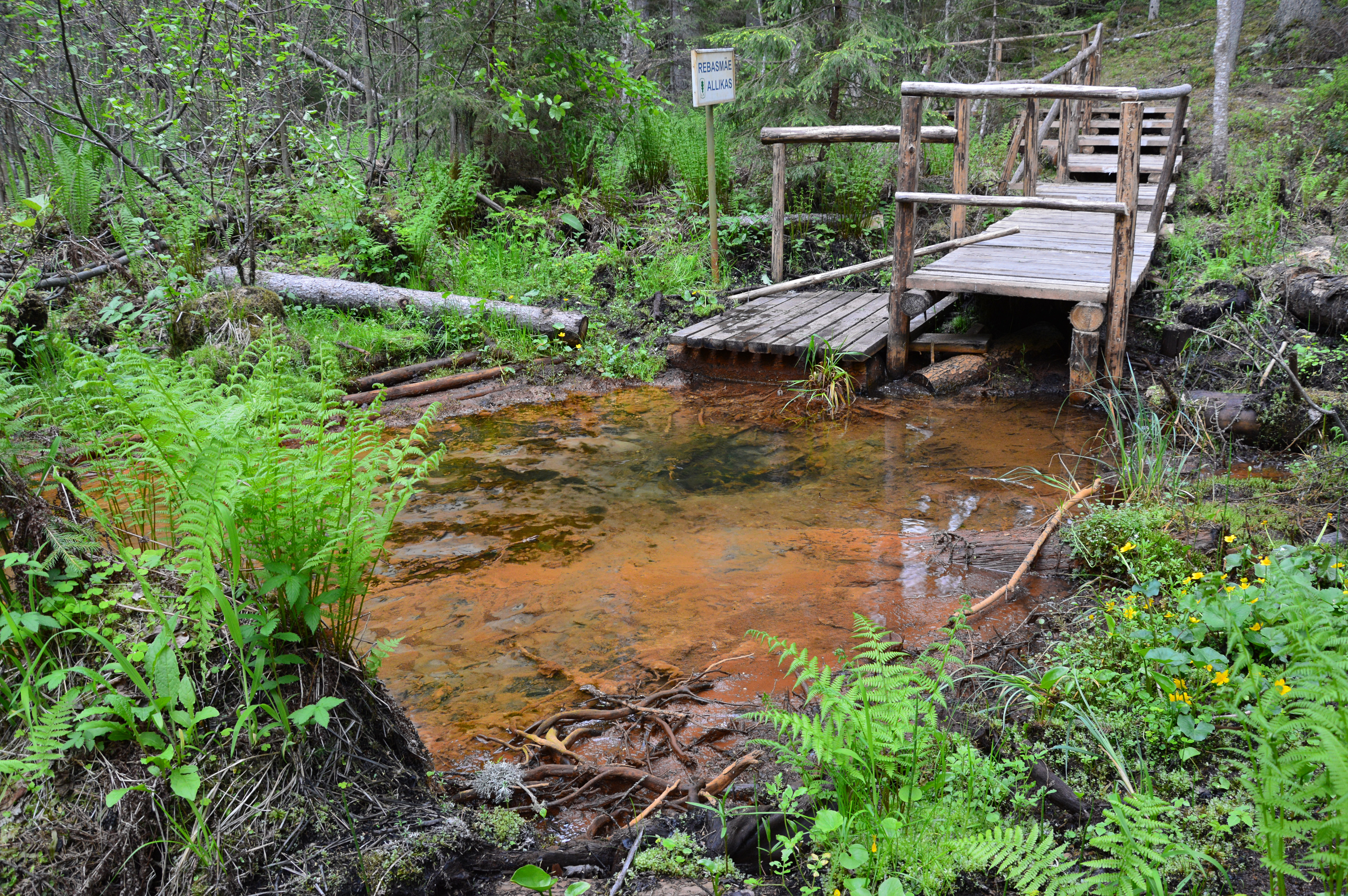
Rebasmäe spring

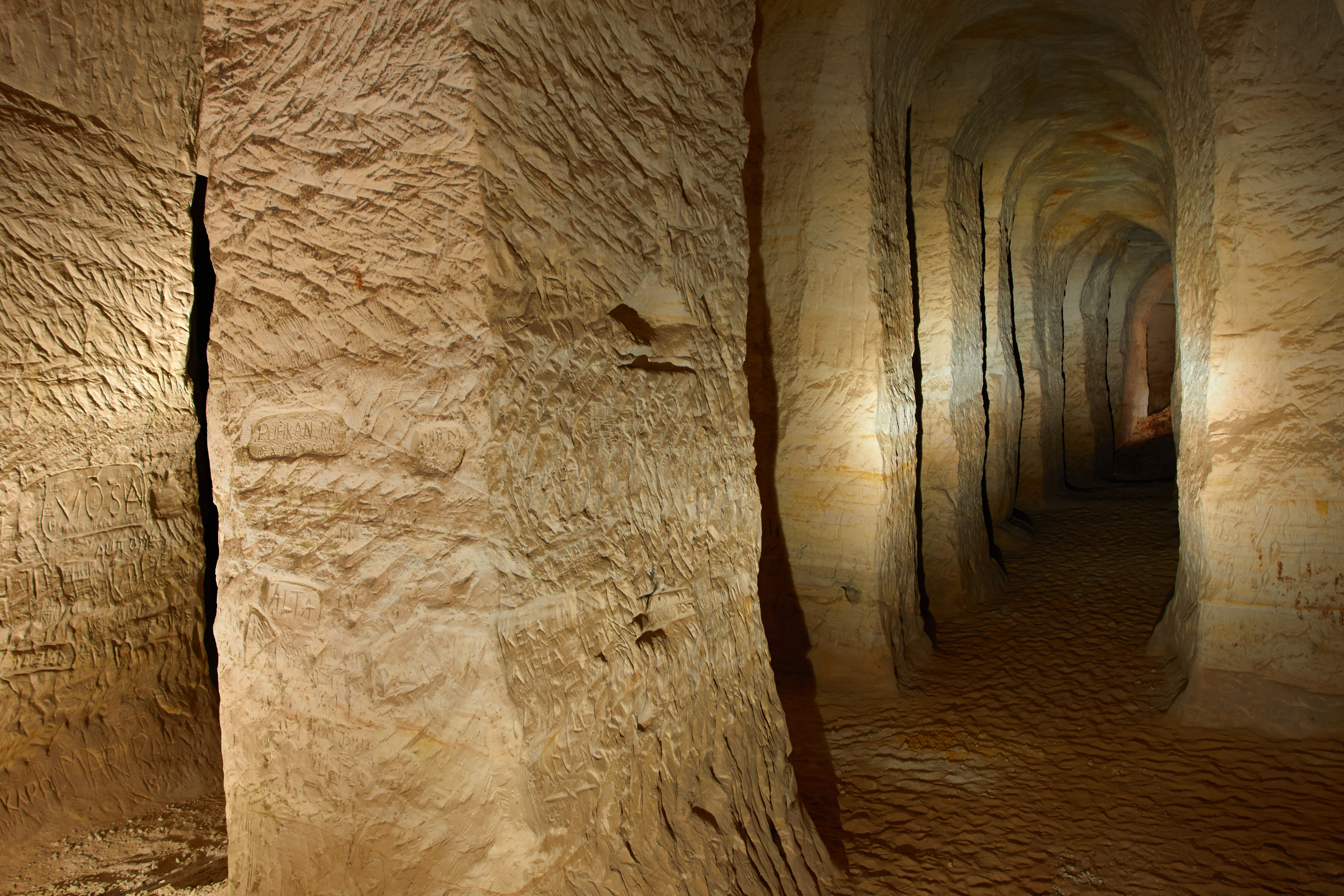
Piusa caves

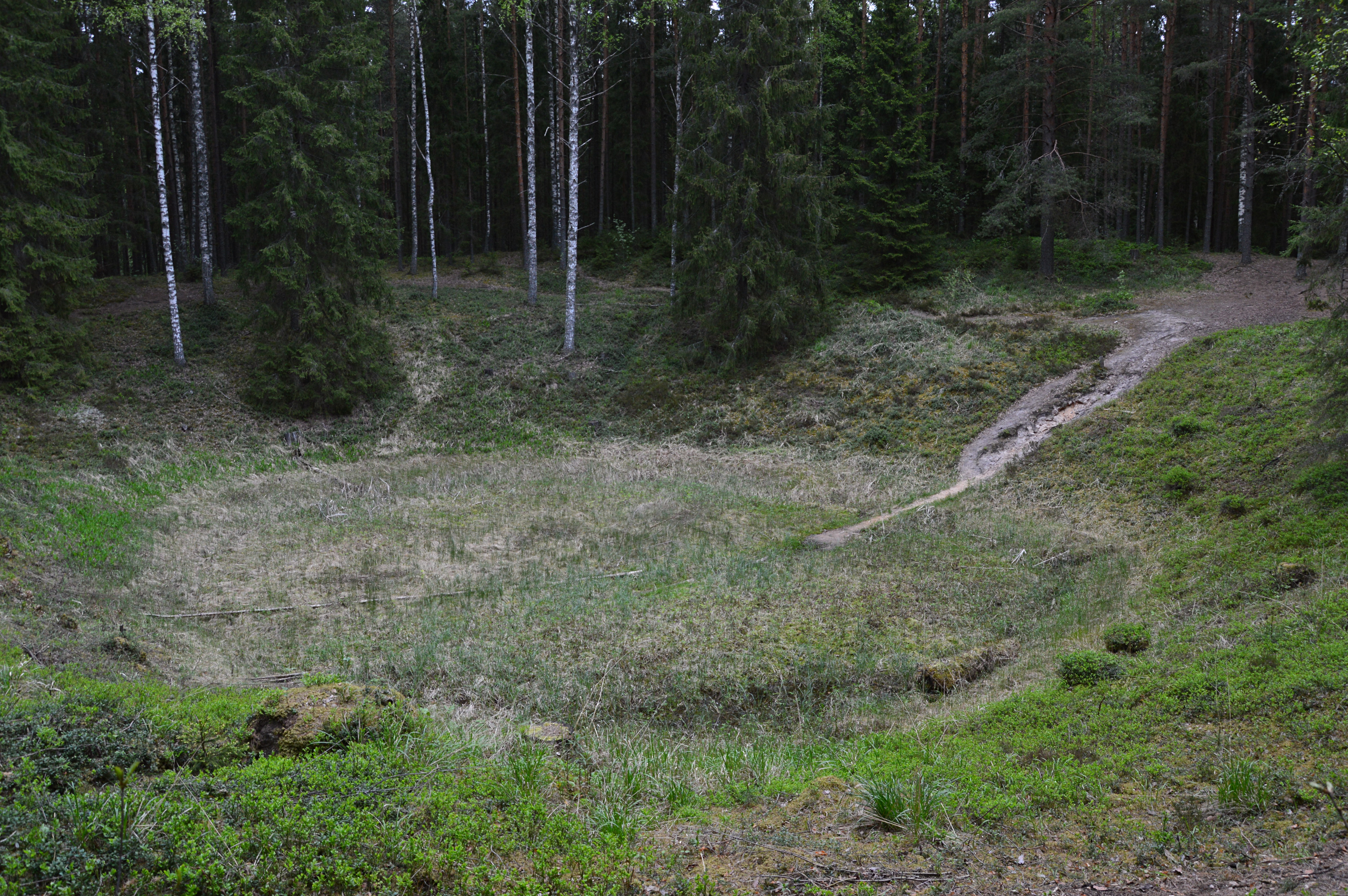
Põrguhaud, biggest of the Ilumetsa craters
