= Old Võmmorski Chapel =

Chapel in Setomaa, Estonia

- Võmmorski vana tsässon
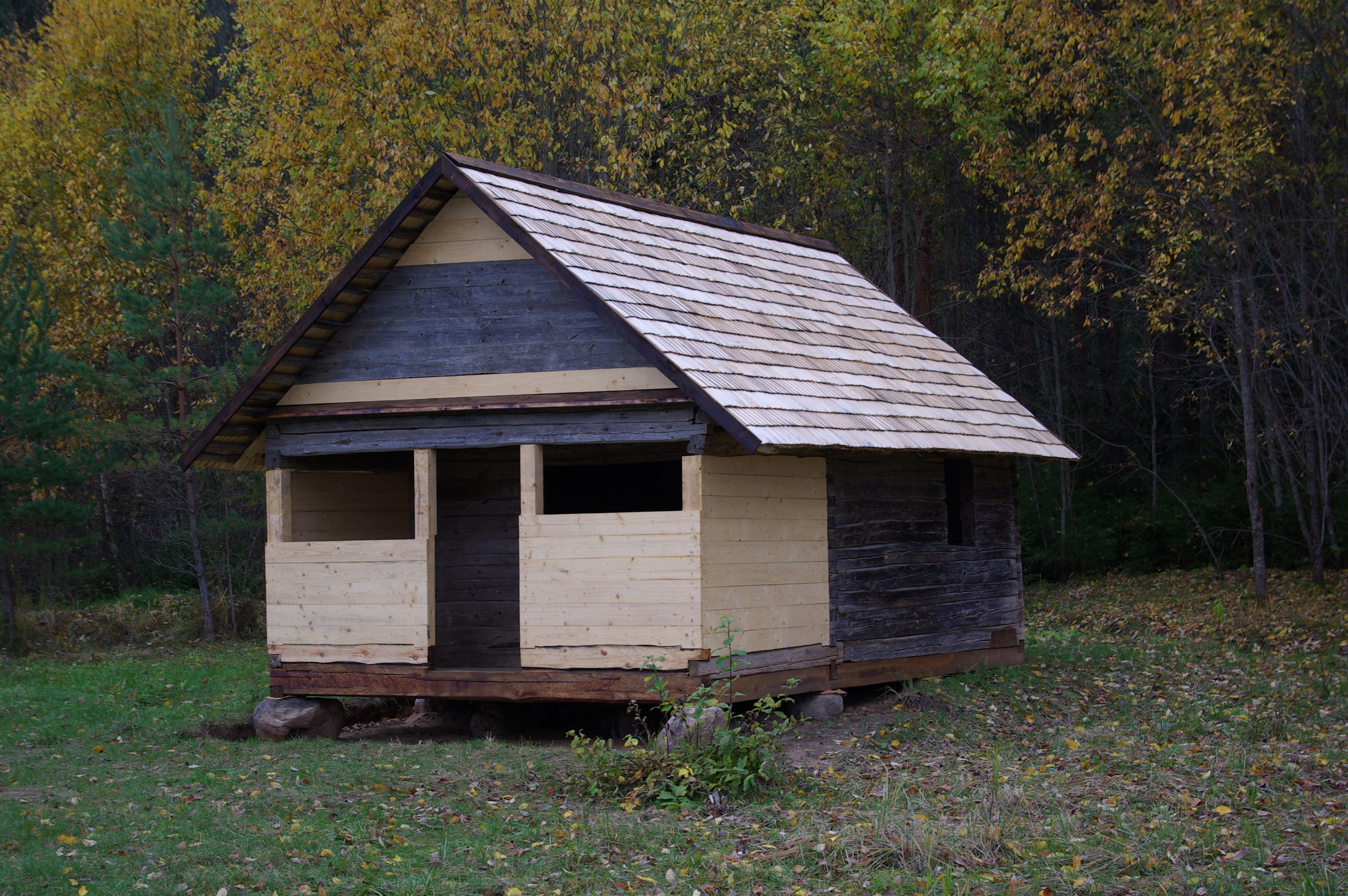

Religion
- Affiliation: Estonian Apostolic Orthodox Church
- Year consecrated: ca 1911

Location
- Location: Võmmorski, Setomaa Parish, Estonia
- Interactive map of Old Võmmorski Chapel
- Coordinates: 57°49′48.4″N 27°32′10.3″E

Architecture
- Materials: wood

Old Võmmorski Chapel (Estonian: Võmmorski vana tsässon) is a small Seto chapel in the village of Võmmorski, Setomaa Parish, Võru County in southeastern Estonia. The chapel was built about 1911 and was dedicated for Whitsunday, also known as Pentecost. It is located in the middle of Võmmorski, on a crossroad south from the Piusa River.

== General information ==
In 2010, the building was disassembled for renovation and put under a cover. According to a dendrochronological research, probable time of building is around 1911 (Läänelaid et al. 2005), but deriving from the photos of 1926, it can be said that the shingle-roof is definitely older than 15 years. The building is not state-protected. The chapel was renovated in 2013 with the help of the money received from a national programme for Estonian churches. The renovation was done by a company named Katusõkatja OÜ.

== Building data ==
Old Võmmorski Chapel is a pine cross-beam building, has a square floor plan and a gable roof, the outer measurements of which are 543 x 368 cm. The main part of the building is square (368 x 373 cm). The beams of the chapel are unhewn from the inside as well as from the outside and are tied in the corners by halving. The building is small and has one interior room (12 m2) and an outer shelter (5 m2). In front of the chapel is an open entrance-room that is supporting on posts and at the moment does not have a barrier. Two of the lower beam rows have remained and presumably the floor of the entrance-room as well. The entrance-room is missing a third beam from above on the end gable. The height of the building from the ground up to where the rafter and the wall unite is 195 cm and the height up to the ridge is 393 cm. In the notes of the 1974 expedition, it was said that the gable roof of the building is made of shingles and the timber boarding has decayed (Kupp 1974). The walls of the building are supported in the corners and in the middle of the beam rows on granite stones. The finishing on the ceiling and on the floor is original. The building has three round log floor boards that are hewn on top and support on the stones. In turn, sawn and planed flooring that is 18–27 cm wide supports on the boards. The size of the doorway is 156 x 137 cm. According to the inventory of 1974, the dimensions of the door of the chapel were 1.40 m x 1.65 m, which is rather questionable, as the doorway is much smaller now. The door is fixed on tender-posts, lower beam row makes for the doorsill. The appearance of the door is not clear from the photograph from the beginning of the 20th century, but the width allows for the assumption that it might have been a two-way door. The other photo shows a one-sided door that supports on very wide tender-posts and probably opened on the inside. The act of inventory from 1974 puts the measurements of the window as 50 x 70 cm. It is also noted that the window has been nailed up with boards, there has not been a window at all during the last couple of years, all is left are jambs (Kupp 1974). The size of the opening is 56 x 72 cm. The exterior of the building has not changed much when compared to the photos from the beginning of the 20th century. There is no boarding in the chapel. Roof material has been changed and two crosses that were on the roof have gone missing. The barrier from the boarded entrance-room has decayed, which used to be covered from the sides up to the gable and on the front almost to the head gable, leaving only about a 20 centimetre gap. In between of the middle support posts is an entrance with a fencing gate.

== Furnishing ==
The furnishings inside the chapel have perished. A wooden slat has remained on the side wall that once supported the icon shelf on the back wall. No pictures have remained. According to the 1974 data from the Dr. Fr. R. Kreutzwald Memorial Museum, the furnishings in the icon room have perished and the room is referred to as the lumber room (Kupp 1974).
