= Lepassaare =

Village in Estonia

Lepassaare Lepässaarõ (in Võro)
- village
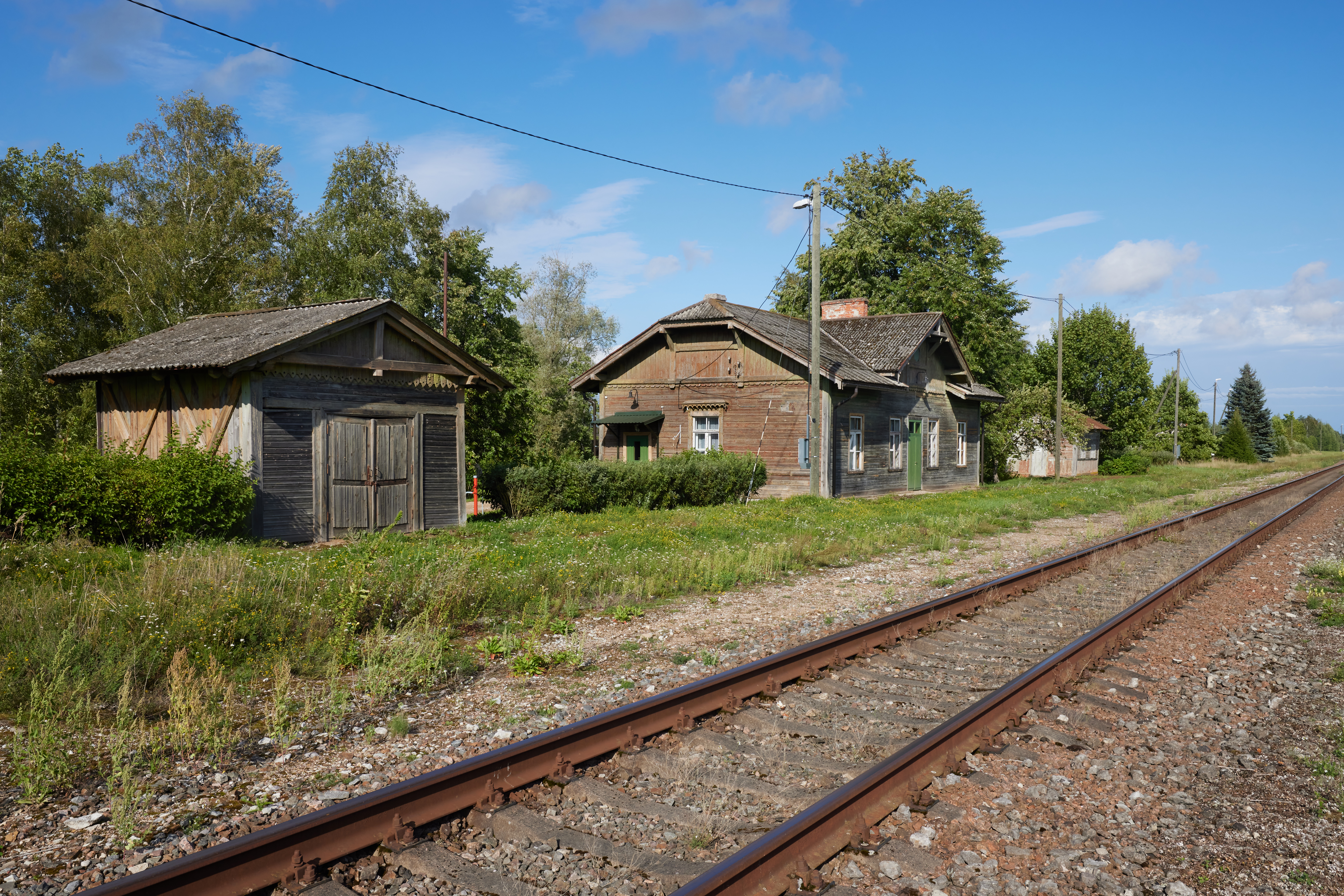
- Lepassaare railway station

- Location in Estonia
- Coordinates: 57°50′47″N 27°19′04″E
- Country: Estonia
- County: Võru County
- Municipality: Võru Parish

Lepassaare (Võro: Lepässaarõ) is a village in Võru Parish, Võru County, in southeastern Estonia. Prior to the 2017 administrative reform of local governments, it was located in Orava Parish.

Lepassaare has a station on currently inactive Valga–Pechory railway.
