= Leo Kunnas =

Estonian military personnel and writer

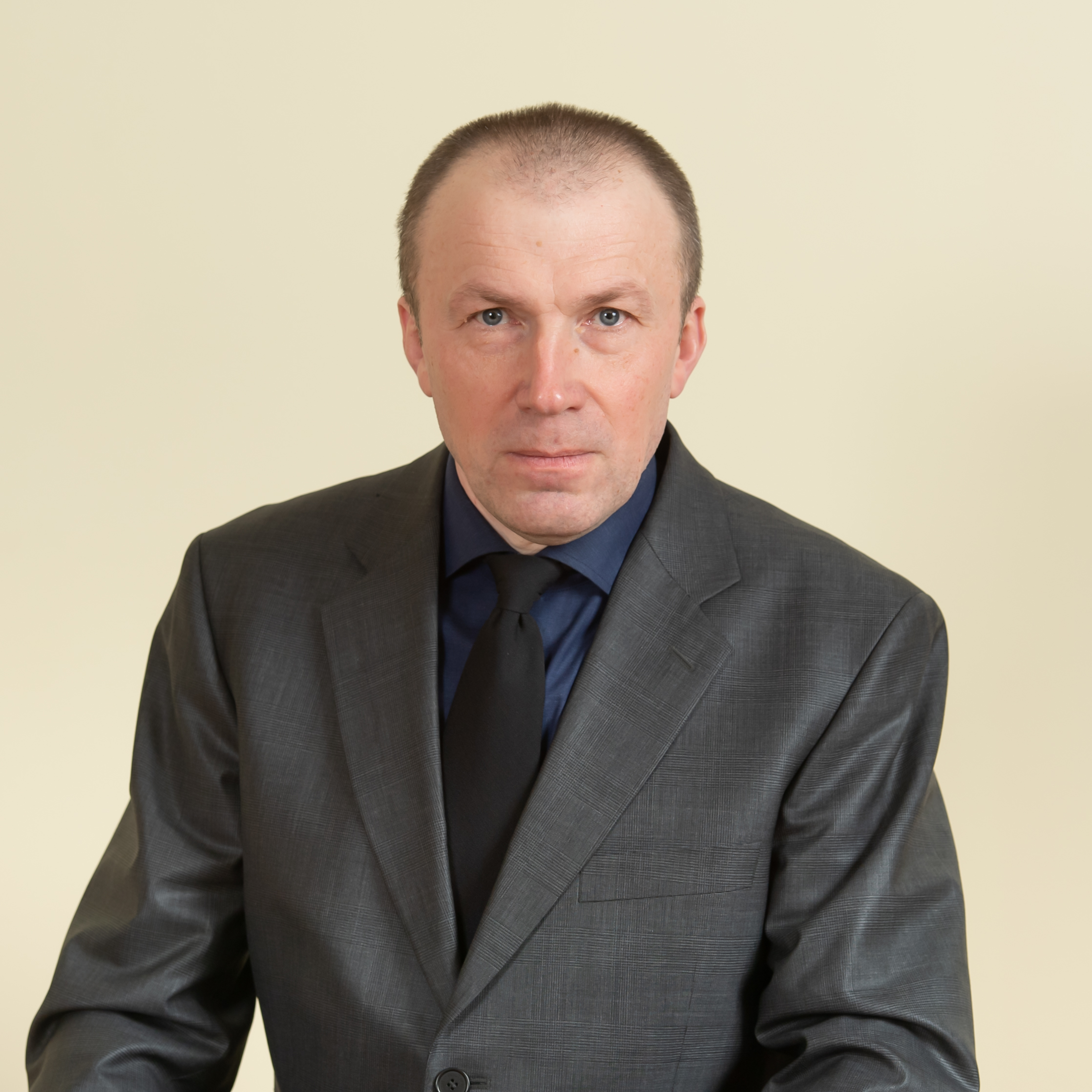
- Born: 14 November 1967 (age 58); Kliima, then part of Estonian SSR, Soviet Union
- Military career
- Allegiance: Estonia
- Branch: Maavägi (Army)
- Service years: 1992 - 2007
- Rank: Lieutenant Colonel (reserve)
- Commands: Meegomäe Battle School; Estonian Military Academy; General Staff Dept of Operations
- Conflicts: Operation Iraqi Freedom
- Awards: 4th class Order of the Cross of the Eagle; Estonian Defence Forces' Distinguished Service Medal; Estonian Defence League's Distinguished Service Medal (2); Bronze Star
- Other work: writer

Leo Kunnas (born 14 November 1967) is an Estonian former military officer and science fiction writer.

Kunnas was born in Kliima village, Võru Parish. After graduating from the Finnish National Defence Academy 1994, Kunnas was the commander of the Defence Forces Battle School (Meegomäe, Võru). He was also the first commander of the Estonian Military Academy 1997-1999 (located in Tallinn at that time).

In 2003–2007, he was the chief of the Department of Operations (J3) of the Estonian Defence Forces General Staff, holding the rank of lieutenant colonel. After graduating from US National Defence University (Norfolk, Virginia) he served 2005 as a staff officer in Operation Iraqi Freedom in MND-Baghdad 3.BCT.

Kunnas resigned from active duty in autumn 2007. The reason for his resignation was the issue of change of Estonian constitution proposed to the parliament by President Toomas Hendrik Ilves.

After his resignation, he has defended the following views in numerous articles: Changing the Estonian Constitution would be a serious mistake. Abolishing the President's role as Supreme Commander of the Defence Forces and giving the role to the Minister of Defense is dangerous. This change would not serve the civilian control over the Estonian Defence Forces, but would give the MOD officials unlimited power over the Estonian Defence Forces and would politicize the officers' and NCO corps. The Estonian nation should be ready to defend itself with a well-trained reserve-based army inside the NATO framework. The weak point of Estonian NATO membership is the lack of any military plans to defend the Baltics, which means that albeit help will eventually come (he is not arguing over Article 5), Estonia would be occupied without credible self-defence. He is referring to the 2003 RAND research, The Baltic States and NATO Membership. Russia is the most serious geopolitical factor for Estonian security which will not be forgotten in defence planning. He argues that Estonia should plan for the worst-case scenario, and this is the reason for the rise in the Estonian reserve component up to 40,000 reservists (the wartime operational structure is currently at around 16,000). The Estonian MOD has done nothing to develop the credible self-defence capability and is focusing only on international missions.

The reaction from the Estonian society and government circles is dualistic in nature. On the one hand, Lt. Gen (Ret.) Johannes Kert thinks that Leo Kunnas is one of the very few people in Estonia who has analytical and very clear vision of the Estonian defence issues. Estonian MOD officials (and especially ex-minister of defence Jürgen Ligi) are strongly against Kunnas' views.

== Education ==
Leo Kunnas has studied history, philosophy and politics in the following universities:

- 1989-1991 - Estonian Humanitarian Institute
- 1991 - University of Helsinki

Military education:

- 1992-1994 Finnish National Defence Academy - 1.Estonian Officer Course
- 2001-2002 Finnish National Defence Academy - Senior Staff Officer Course
- 2005 US National Defence University (Norfolk, Virginia)

== Military career ==
=== Estonian Army ===
- 1992 Ensign
- 1994 Second Lieutenant
- 1995 First Lieutenant
- 1997 Captain
- 1999 Major
- 2003 Lieutenant Colonel

== Belletristic Activity ==
=== Novels ===
- 1990 - "Kustumatu valguse maailm" ( The World of the Eternal Light)
- 2001 - "Sõdurjumala teener" (Servant of the Soldier God)
- 2008 - "Gort Ashryn" I osa "Enne viimast sõda" (Before the last war)
- 2009 - "Gort Ashryn" II osa "Sõda" (War)
- 2010 - "Gort Ashryn" III osa "Rahu" (Peace)

=== Documentary Stories ===
- 2006 - "Viiv pikas sõjas" (A Moment in the Long War) - some parts are available on-line

=== Articles an Interviews in Estonian newspapers ===
- "Põhiseaduslik korratus ilma kaitseväe juhatajata" (The Constitutional Disorder without the Commander of Estonian Defence Forces)- Postimees 03.10.2007
- "NATO nõrgeneb - mida teha?" (NATO is weakening - what to should be done?) - Eesti Päevaleht 28.11.07
- "Eesti 2007: Pyrrhose võit" (Estonia 2007: Phyrros Victory) - Eesti Päevaleht 31.12.07
- "Lõiv õhukesele riigile" (The idea of "thin" state) - Eesti Päevaleht 29.01.08
- "35 viga iseseisva kaitsevõime ülesehitamisel" (35 Mistakes of building up the Estonian Military Capabilities) - Eesti Ekspress 07.02.2008
- "Eesti: raua ja verega sündinud riik" (Estonia: State that has born from Iron and Blood) - Eesti Päevaleht 21.02.08
- "Läti saatuslik valik" (The Fatal Choice of Latvia) - "Eesti Päevaleht" 06.03.2008
- "Eesti kui A-grupi potensiaalne konfliktikolle" (Estonia as the A-Group conflict centre) - "Eesti Päevaleht" 08.04.2008.
- "Riigikaitse juriidiline rägastik" (Juridical Maze of Estonian Defence) - "Eesti Päevaleht" 20.04.2008.
- "Müüt rahuaja kaitseväest" (Myth of the peace-time army) - "Eesti Päevaleht" 22.04.2008.
- "Kaitsekulutuste suurendamine: mille arvelt?" (How to raise defence expenditures?) - "Eesti Päevaleht" 28.07.2008.
- "Leo Kunnas: eestlased peavad oma riiki ise kaitsma." (Estonians shall defend their country oneselves ) - "Postimees" 14.08.2008.

== Trivia ==
At the age of 16, Leo Kunnas was sentenced to Soviet prison for attempted border crossing and possession of firearms. One of the prosecutors was Ain Seppik, a former Communist and current Estonian top politician. Kunnas looks back at the violent prison years in his novel, The World of the Eternal Light, which won the Looming annual award 1991. His novel "Sõdurjumala teener" (Servant of the Soldier God) earned the second place award at the Estonian novel competition of 2000.

In 2007 the Journalists Association Estonia announced his article "Eesti 2007: Phyrrose võit" (Eesti Päevaleht, 31.12.07) as the best opinion article of the year.

== Personal life ==
His wife Kaja Kunnas is a journalist. Leo Kunnas has three children.
