= Piusa Ancient Valley Holiday Complex =

Tourism farm in Estonia

Coordinates: 57°46′30″N 27°21′59″E

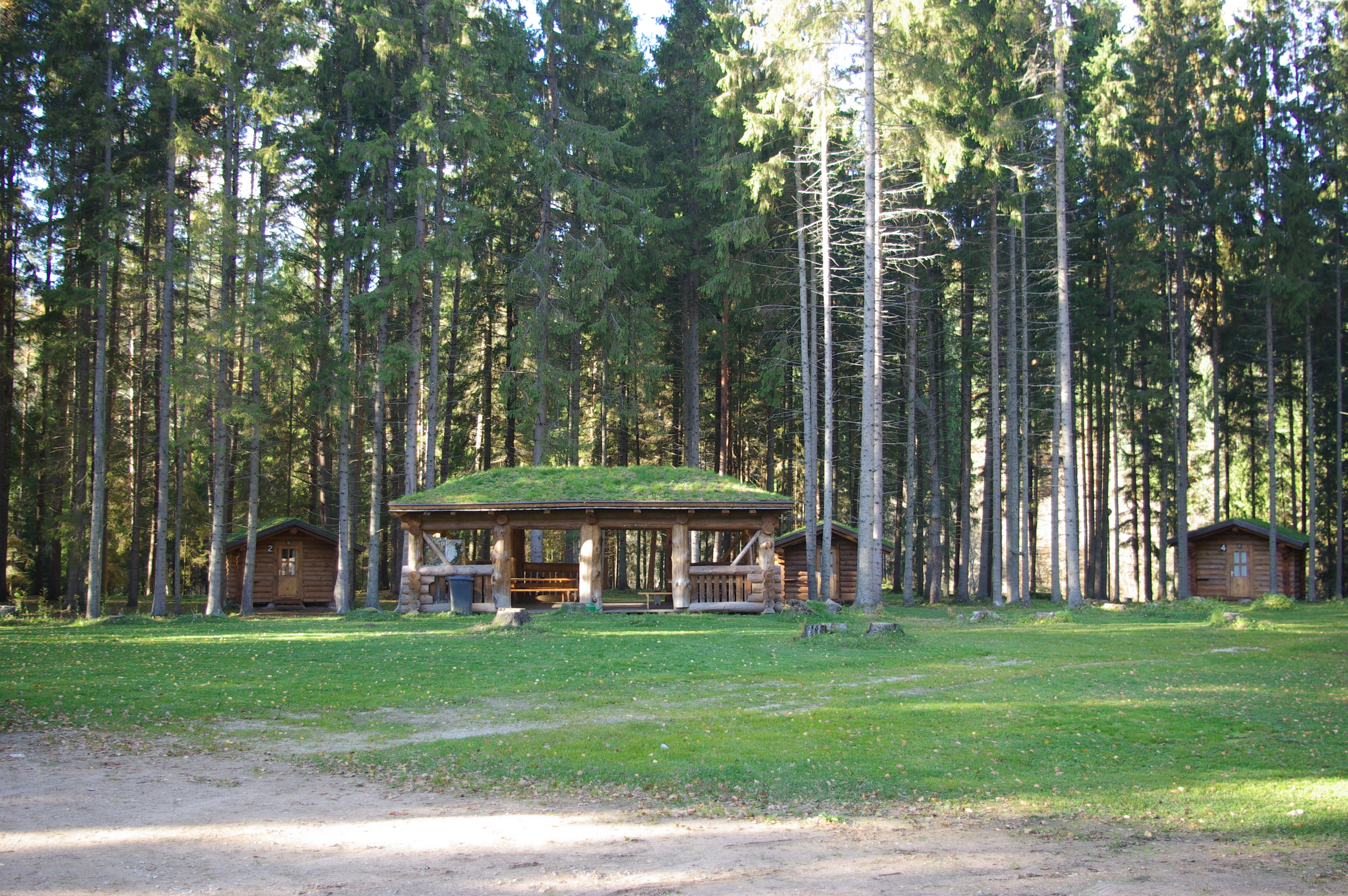
Piusa Ancient Valley Holiday Complex

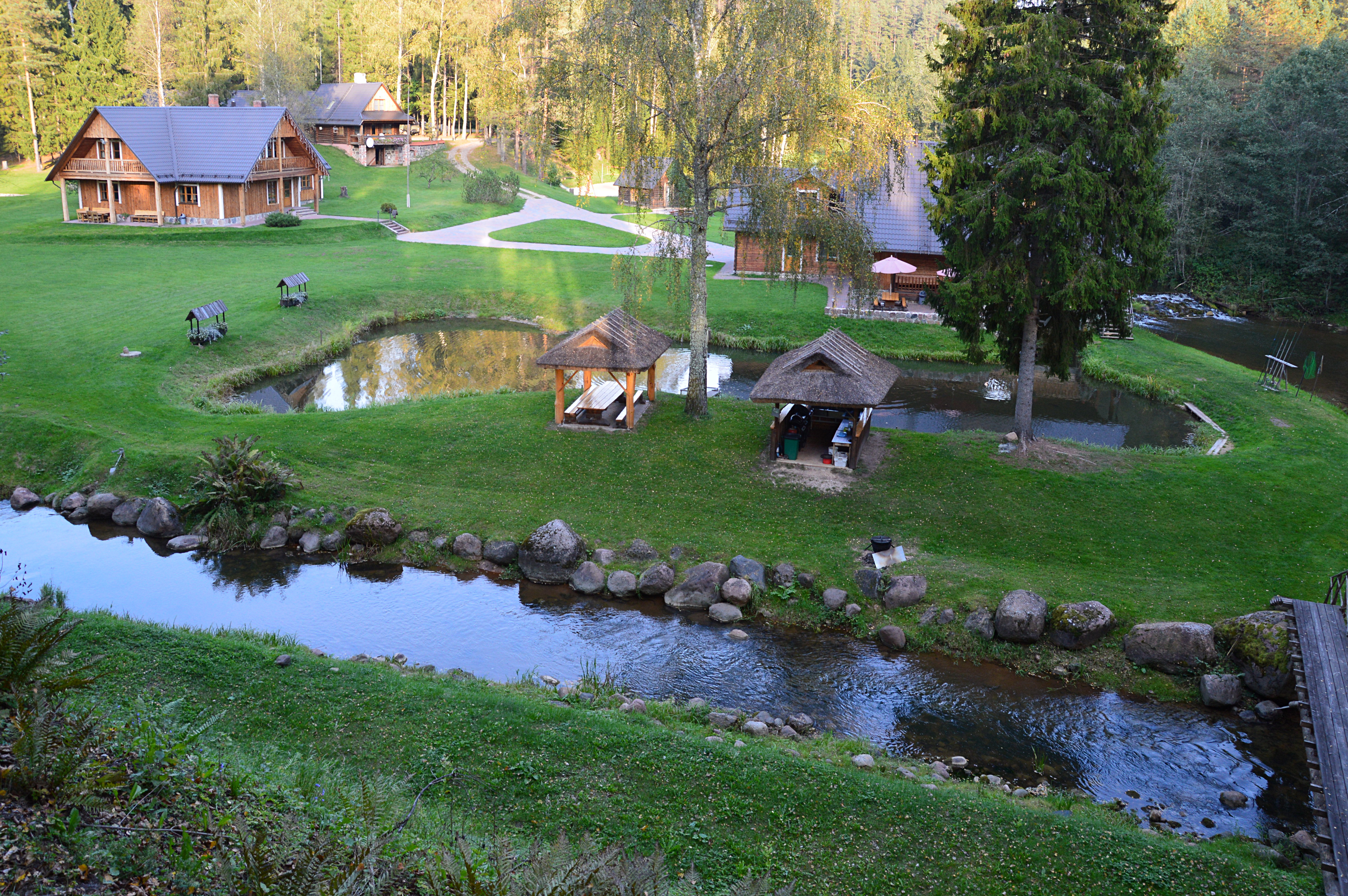

Piusa Ancient Valley Holiday Complex is a tourism farm in Setomaa Parish, Võru County in Piusa River ancient valley in southeastern Estonia.

== History ==
Piusa Ancient Valley Holiday Complex is situated in the former place of Väiko-Härma mill. Väiko-Härma mill was established by Aleksander Laanberg (later changed to Laanemäe through Estonianization) around the 1930s, he attained the building site on the right bank of the river. He made a contract with Voldemar Vider, the owner of the left bank to use the bank, by paying 20 poods of rye a year. The mill had two sets of stones. One set of stones was able to grind 300-400 kilos of dry grains in an hour. Besides milling, the following services were provided: spalting - that kept the roofs in the neighbourhood in order, a circular saw made it able to manufacture shingles and fence rails, a planer was used for making smaller woodwork. The mill lake had pikes, perches, burbots, roaches, brown trouts and crayfish in it. In 1963, the mill belonged to “Võidu” sovkhoz, the miller was Kusta Klaas, who, as a knowledgeable expert, fixed up the mill. The mill ran until 1972. In 1946, a new house was built near the mill (the current holiday house), where Laanemäe family lived until 1961. After that the building was empty.

== Today ==
After the farm had been inherited and given away several times, it eventually made it to Laanemäe’s son Koit. The holiday house of today was renovated in 1999. Visitors have been accepted to this building since the year 2000. Piusa Ancient Valley Holiday Complex is managed by OÜ NAXOS. The holiday house has 4 bedrooms, altogether 9 places. There is WiFi in the building and in its precinct. A sauna built in the old smithy is located right by the river. Visitors can also stay in a renovated granary with 6 places. The smoke sauna is a little further from the accommodation and makes up a small complex of its own together with a fireplace and camping sites. The smoke sauna is a building made of manually hacked beams and with a turf roof. Visitors can also stay in camping log houses.

== Additional information ==
The 15 kilometre hiking trail in the primeval valley of the Piusa River leads by the holiday house. The nearby forests are known for their abundance of berries and mushrooms.
