= Kliima =

Village in Estonia

Coordinates: 57°52′N 27°29′E

- Village
- Interactive map of Kliima
- Country: Estonia
- County: Võru County
- Parish: Võru Parish
- Time zone: UTC+2 (EET)
  - Summer (DST): UTC+3 (EEST)

Kliima is a village in Võru Parish, Võru County in southeastern Estonia. Prior to the 2017 administrative reform of local governments, it was located in Orava Parish.

Writer and former military officer Leo Kunnas (born 1967) was born in Kliima.
