= Piusa Caves Nature Reserve =

Protected area in Estonia

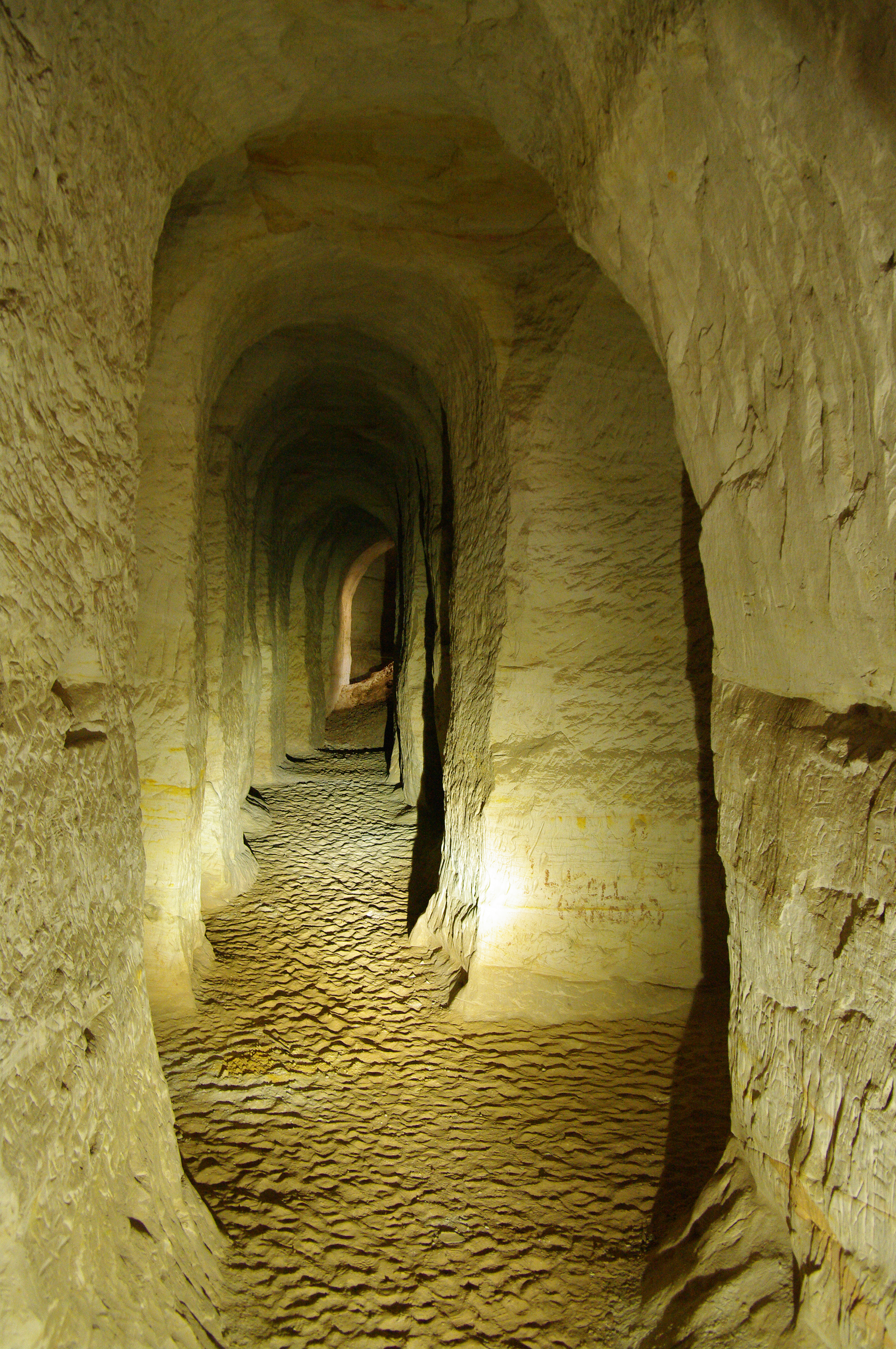
- Piusa Caves

- Location within Estonia
- Location: Piusa, Võru County, Estonia
- Nearest city: Võru
- Coordinates: 57°50′30″N 27°28′00″E
- Area: 48 ha (120 acres)
- Established: 2009

Piusa Caves Nature Reserve (Estonian: Piusa koobastiku looduskaitseala) is a nature reserve in Piusa, Võru County, Estonia. Its area is 48 ha. The goals of the nature reserve are to protect the Piusa caves and the bats that live in the caves.

In 1981 Piusa caves were taken under protection and in 1992 the nature reserve was formed.
