= Koidula railway station =

Railway station in Estonia at the border with Russia

Koidula
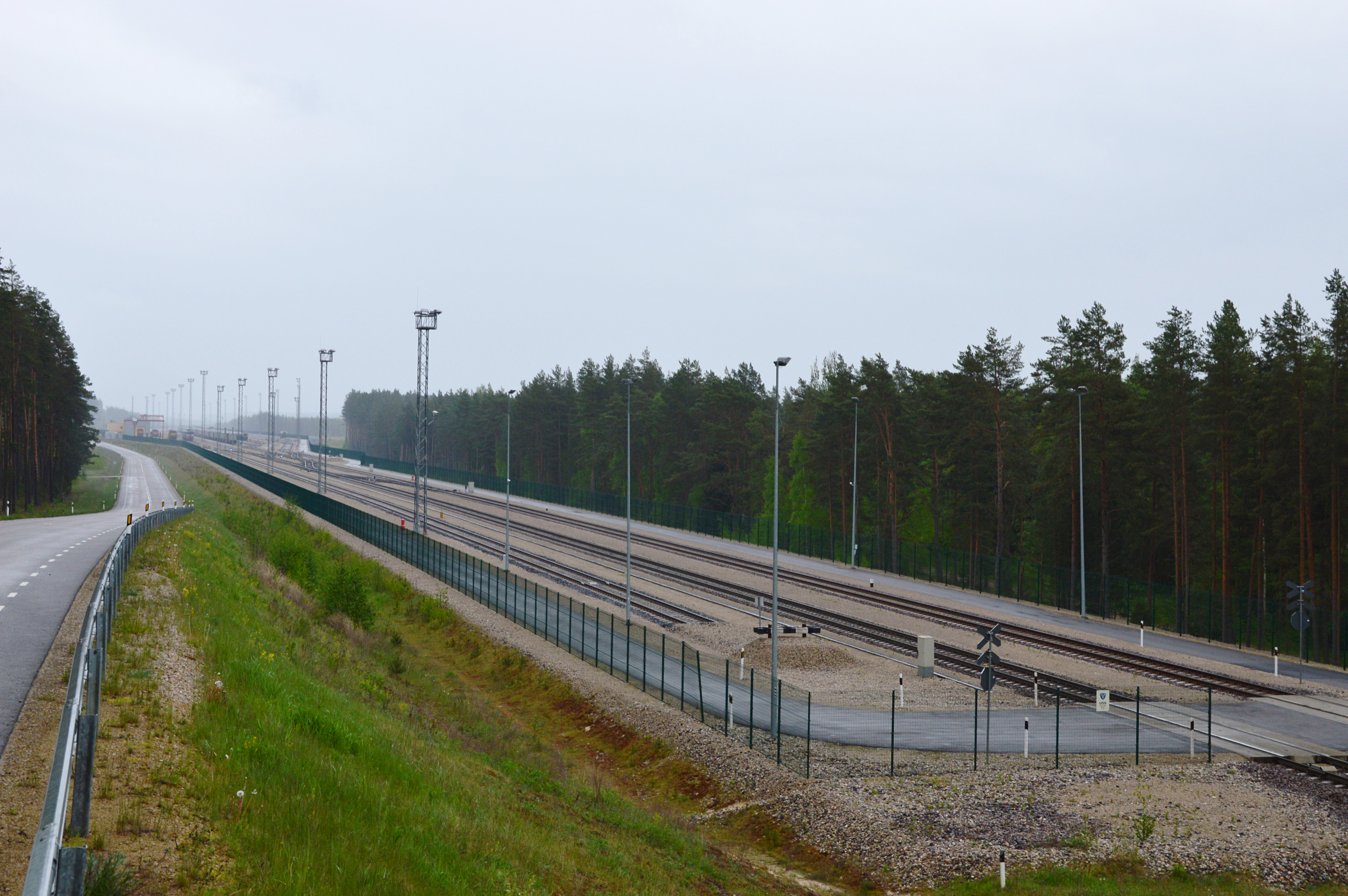

General information
- Location: Setomaa Parish, Võru County; Estonia
- Coordinates: 57°50′13.31″N 27°34′19.48″E
- System: border railway station
- Owner: Eesti Raudtee
- Lines: Tartu–Koidula; Valga–Pechory
- Platforms: 2
- Tracks: 10
- Train operators: Elron
- Connections: Regional Buses 83A 83D 92B 114 196 197

Construction
- Structure type: at-grade
- Accessible: yes

Other information
- Fare zone: None (station-based ticket price)

History
- Opened: 3 September 2011; 15 years ago

Services
Preceding station	Elron	Following station
Orava towards Tallinn	Tallinn–Tartu–Koidula	through to Pechory
Piusa Summer seasons Terminus	Tallinn–Tartu–Koidula	through to Pechory
Location
- Location within Estonia

Koidula railway station (Estonian: Koidula raudteejaam) is a railway station in Koidula, Estonia, on the Russian border. It merges the Tartu–Pechory and Valga–Pechory railways just before the Russian border (Pechory is located straight after the border). The station opened in September 2011, and is nearly 2 km from the border with Russia. The main purpose of the station is making the crossing of Russian border easier for both goods and passengers. It also enabled the traffic on "Southeast Estonian Triangle" (Tartu–Valga–Piusa–Tartu) without crossing the Russian border. Russian passenger services from Pskov to Pechory have not connected to the Elron services in Estonia since Koidula station opened. It was not listed as a border station in a 2002 agreement between Russia and Estonia and, despite being included in the 2012 revision, infrastructure repair pushed back the introduction of passenger services.

The station gets 2-3 passenger trains a day to Tartu, and during summertimes to Piusa, operated by Elron.

Freight volumes were reduced by up to 80% due to international sanctions during the 2022 Russian invasion of Ukraine.

== See also ==
- List of railway stations in Estonia
- Rail transport in Estonia
