= Suuremetsa =

Village in Estonia

Coordinates: 57°51′N 27°20′E

- Village
- Interactive map of Suuremetsa
- Country: Estonia
- County: Võru County
- Parish: Võru Parish
- Time zone: UTC+2 (EET)
  - Summer (DST): UTC+3 (EEST)

Suuremetsa is a village in Võru Parish, Võru County in southeastern Estonia. Prior to the 2017 administrative reform of local governments, it was located in Orava Parish.
