= Korgõmõisa =

Village in Estonia

Coordinates: 57°52′32″N 27°28′19″E

- Village
- Interactive map of Korgõmõisa
- Country: Estonia
- County: Võru County
- Parish: Võru Parish
- Time zone: UTC+2 (EET)
  - Summer (DST): UTC+3 (EEST)

Korgõmõisa is a village in Võru Parish, Võru County in southeastern Estonia. Prior to the 2017 administrative reform of local governments, it was located in Orava Parish.
