= Pelska =

River in Estonia

Location
- Countries: Estonia; Russia

Physical characteristics
- Mouth: Piusa
  - coordinates: 57°49′34″N 27°31′59″E
- Length: 5.5 km (3.4 mi)
- Basin size: 85.2 km^{2} (32.9 sq mi)

Basin features
- Progression: Piusa→ Lake Peipus→ Narva→ Gulf of Finland

The Pelska (also known as the Belka) is a river in southeastern Estonia, although its headwaters are in Russian territory. It is a right tributary of the Piusa.

The river has little organic matter in it, but it is on the List of Spawning Places and Habitation of Salmon, Brown Trout, Sea Trout, and Grayling in Estonia (RTL 2004, 87 1362). The length of the river is 5.5 km, and the river basin is 85.2 km^{2}. The village of Võmmorski lies along the river.

The name of the river is derived from the village of Pelska, which the river flows through on the Russian side of the border. On Estonian territory, the river flows through the village of Seto, and it is also called the Pelska. The name Belka has come into use through Russian topographic maps. The river is a public watercourse in Estonia. Basin information is provided by the Land Improvement Offices put together in 2008 and 2009, or, in the absence of it, information about the area of basins calculated from the 1990s drainage area map is used. Earlier calculations of the basin size were 85.2 km^{2} in 1986 and 14.9 km^{2} calculated from the basin map put together at the end of 1990s.

Mustoja and Helbi creeks flow into the Pelska; the river itself discharges into the Piusa. The European bullhead (Cottus cobio) is well known among the species of fish in the river.
