= Kakusuu =

Village in Estonia

Coordinates: 57°52′15″N 27°27′02″E

- Village
- Interactive map of Kakusuu
- Country: Estonia
- County: Põlva County
- Parish: Võru Parish
- Time zone: UTC+2 (EET)
  - Summer (DST): UTC+3 (EEST)

Kakusuu is a village in Võru Parish, Põlva County in southeastern Estonia. Prior to the 2017 administrative reform of local governments, it was located in Orava Parish.
