= Küläjärv =

Lake in Estonia

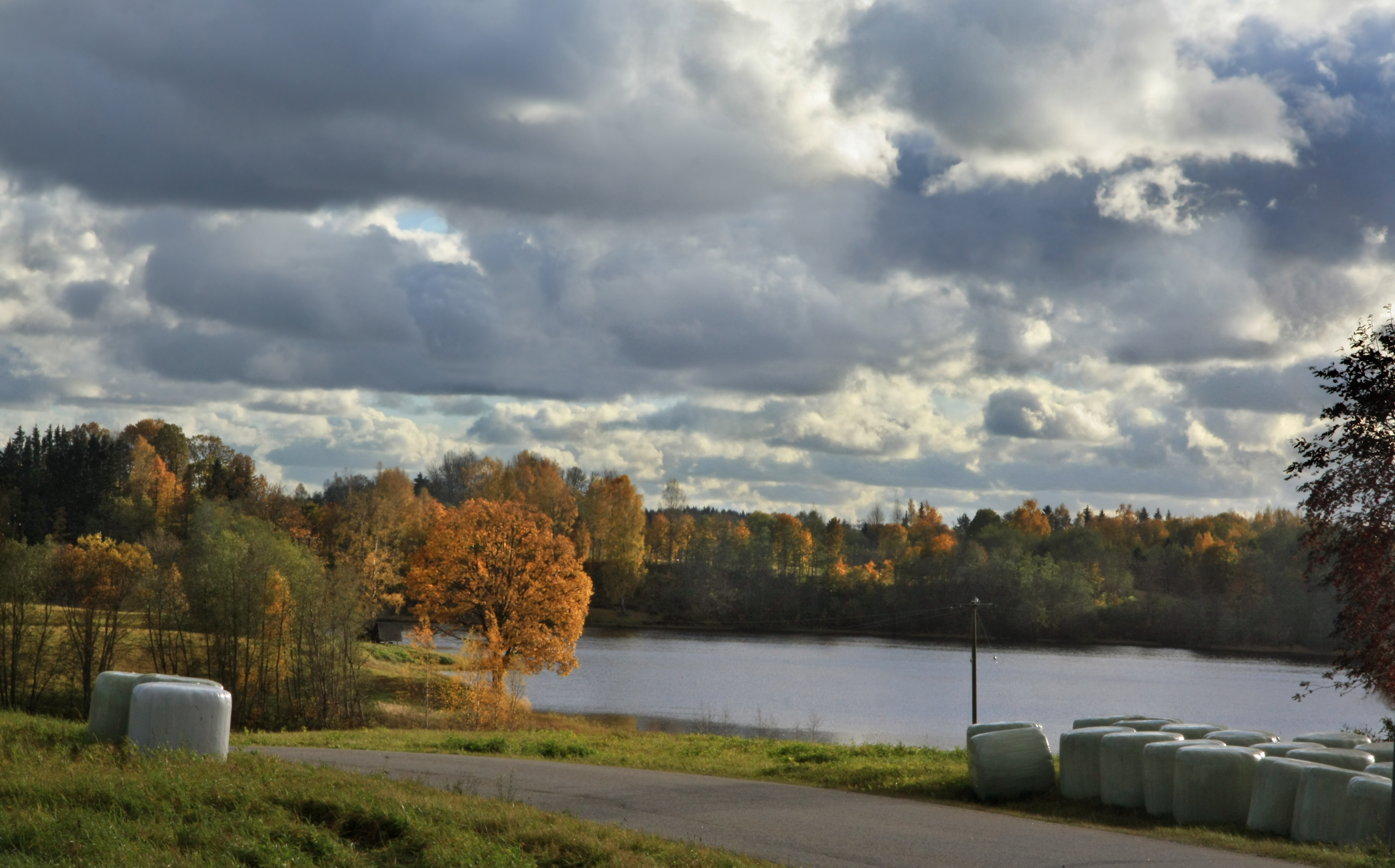

- Location within Estonia
- Location: Rõuge Parish; Võru County
- Coordinates: 57.6775°N 27.0763889°E
- Basin countries: Estonia
- Max. length: 870 meters (2,850 ft)
- Surface area: 23.4 hectares (58 acres)
- Average depth: 3.3 meters (11 ft)
- Max. depth: 3.9 meters (13 ft)
- Water volume: 800,000 cubic meters (28,000,000 cu ft)
- Shore length^{1}: 3,450 meters (11,320 ft)
- Surface elevation: 244.1 meters (801 ft)
- Islands: 3
- ^{1} Shore length is not a well-defined measure.

Küläjärv (also known as Plaani Küläjärv, Plaani järv, Suurjärv, or Plaani Külajärv) is a lake in southeastern Estonia. It is located in the village of Plaani in Rõuge Parish, Võru County, close to the border with Latvia.

== Physical description ==
The lake has an area of 23.4 hectares (58 acres), and it has three islands with a combined area of 0.7 hectares (1.7 acres). The lake has an average depth of 3.3 meters (11 ft) and a maximum depth of 3.9 meters (13 ft). It is 870 meters (2,850 ft) long, and its shoreline measures 3,450 meters (11,320 ft). It has a volume of 800,000 cubic meters (28,000,000 cu ft).

== See also ==
- List of lakes of Estonia
