= Kamnitsa =

Village in Estonia

Coordinates: 57°56′N 27°26′E

Kamnitsa Kaamnitsa (in Võro)
- Village
- Interactive map of Kamnitsa
- Country: Estonia
- County: Võru County
- Parish: Võru Parish
- Time zone: UTC+2 (EET)
  - Summer (DST): UTC+3 (EEST)

Kamnitsa is a village in Võru Parish, Võru County, in southeastern Estonia. Prior to the 2017 administrative reform of local governments, it was located in Orava Parish.
