= Päka =

Village in Estonia

Coordinates: 57°57′N 27°29′E

- Village
- Interactive map of Päka
- Country: Estonia
- County: Võru County
- Parish: Võru Parish
- Time zone: UTC+2 (EET)
  - Summer (DST): UTC+3 (EEST)

Päka is a village in Võru Parish, Põlva County in southeastern Estonia.

In 1992-2017 (before the administrative reform of Estonian local governments) the village was located in Orava parish of Põlva county.

The northern border of Paka village is marked by the Rebasmäe brook, next to which the Rebasmäe repository was formed.

The village is crossed by the Niitsik-Võmmmorski road.
