= Piusa =

Village in Estonia

- village
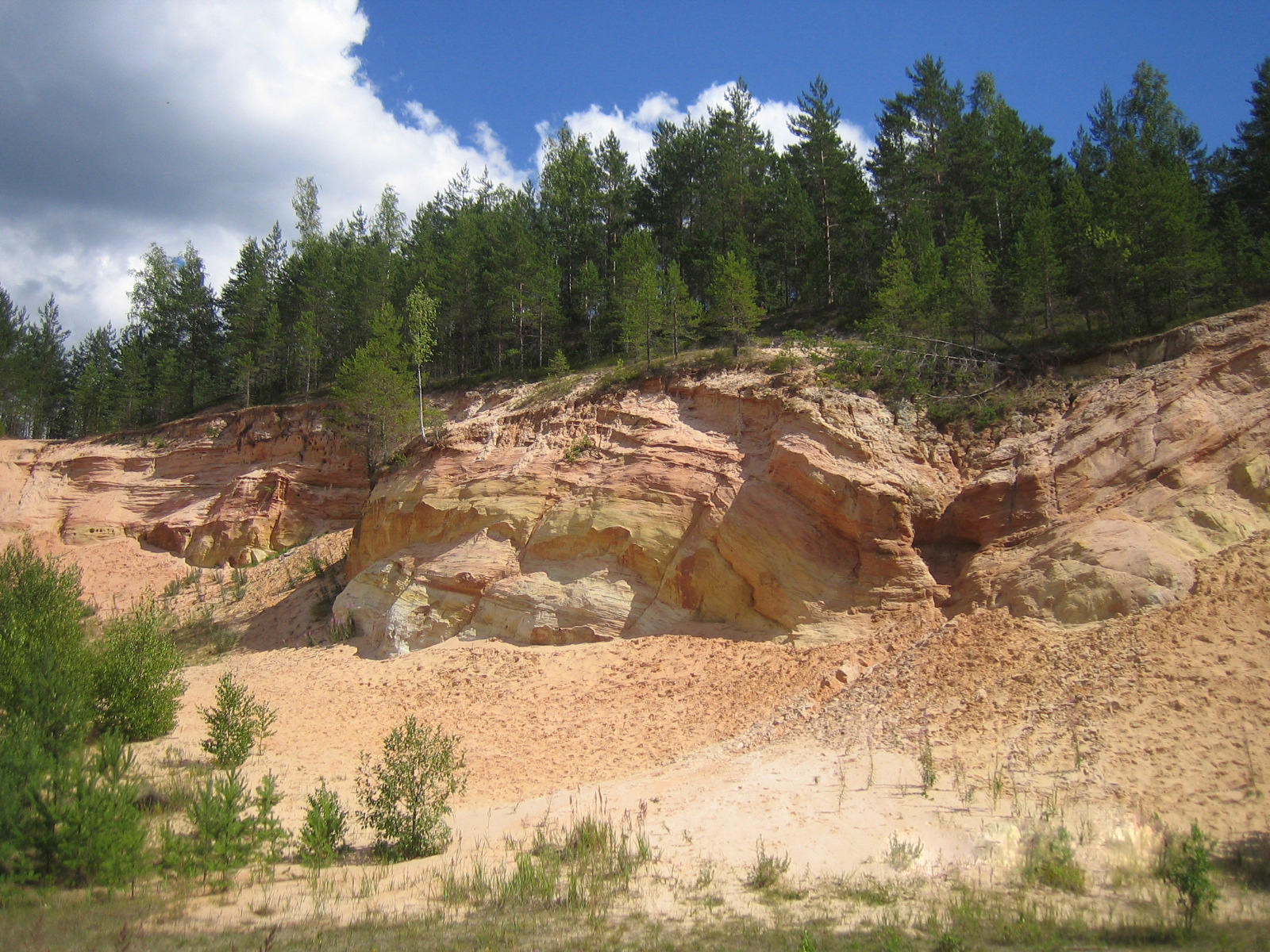
- Wall of previous sand quarry in Piusa.

- Location in Estonia
- Coordinates: 57°50′28″N 27°28′10″E
- Country: Estonia
- County: Võru County
- Municipality: Võru Parish

Piusa is a village in Võru Parish, Võru County, in southeastern Estonia. It is located on the left bank of the river Piusa, near the border of Russia. Prior to the 2017 administrative reform of local governments, it was located in Orava Parish.

Piusa is famous for its sand caves along the river.

Sand quarries for glass production are active in Piusa since 1922.

Piusa has a station on the railway line that formerly linked Valga and Pechory. As of 2022 there are up to two services a day in the summer season (from May until August) from Piusa to Koidula railway station on the border with Russia, with one service in each direction having a connection to / from Tartu.

On 4 May 2011 a shooting incident between police officers and local landowner took place on the territory of Piusa village, close to Võmmorski. As a result, the landowner and a police officer died and two were wounded.

Preceding station	Elron	Following station
Terminus	Tallinn–Tartu–Koidula Summertime branch	Koidula Terminus
