= SOE =

SOE may refer to:

== Organizations ==
- State-owned enterprise
- Special Operations Executive, a British World War II clandestine sabotage and resistance organisation
  - Special Operations Executive in the Netherlands, or Englandspiel
- Society of Operations Engineers, a British professional organization
- Sony Online Entertainment, a game developing company, now known as Daybreak Game Company

== Science and technology ==
- Soap opera effect, the visual result of motion smoothing functions found in many modern televisions
- Splicing by overlap extension polymerase chain reaction, a variant of polymerase chain reaction
- Standard Operating Environment, computer operating system and associated software

== Transport ==
- Souanké Airport (IATA airport code), an airport in the Republic of the Congo
- Southend East railway station (National Rail station code), a railway station in Essex, England

== Other uses ==
- South African Police Star for Outstanding Service (post-nominal SOE)
- State of emergency, a condition in which a government is granted additional powers in times of peril
- SO Emyrne, the football section of a sports club in Madagascar
- Secret of Evermore, video game

== See also ==
- Soe (disambiguation)
