= Ilumetsa crater =

Impact craters in Estonia

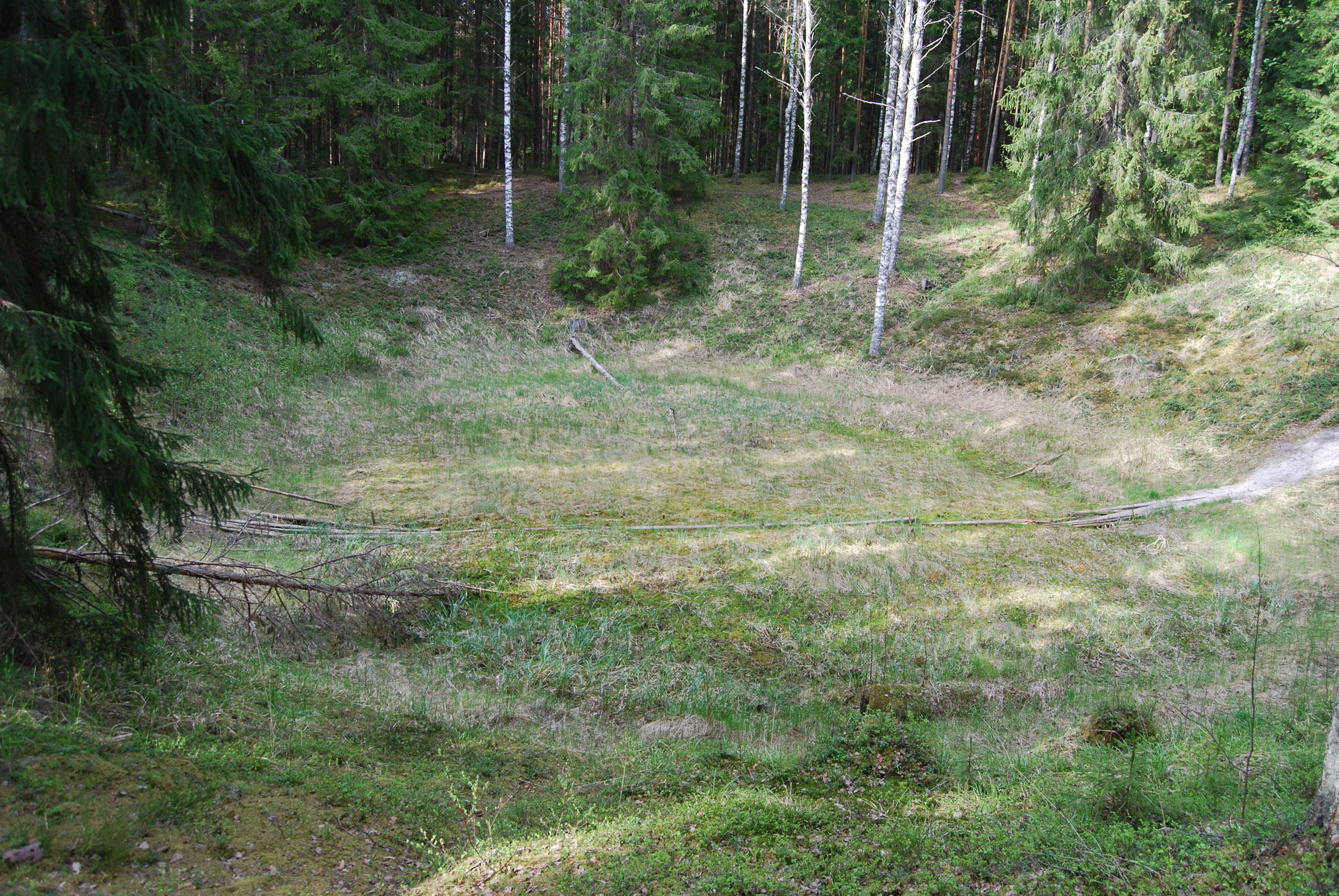
- Ilumetsa crater

- Location within Estonia
- Location: Estonia; 57°57′36.17″N 27°24′10.43″E

Impact crater structure
- Confidence: Probable
- Diameter: 80 m (260 ft)
- Age: 7 ka
- Exposed: Yes
- Drilled: Yes

Ilumetsa is a set of two probable meteorite craters in Estonia.

The Ilumetsa site is located in south eastern Estonia and it consists of two structures, located 725 m from each other. Their diameters are: 75–80 m and ~50 m. Their true depths are about 8 and 3.5 m, respectively. Both structures are surrounded by a rim up to a few meters high: the rims are highest in their eastern parts with maximum rim heights of Ilumetsa Large 4.5 m and 1.5 m for Ilumetsa Small.

The Large Ilumetsa structure has been dated by radiocarbon dating the gyttja and peat from the very bottom of the crater shaped depression. The lowermost organic beds were dated to 6030 +/-100 14C years (7170– 6660 cal. years BP). Recent radiocarbon dating charcoals buried within assumed proximal ejecta blankets of these crater-like features showed Ilumetsa Large and Ilumetsa Small formed simultaneously between 7170 and 7000 cal. years BP.

No clear meteorite fragments or shock metamorphic effects were ever found around those structures. Because of that Ilumetsa is not a proven impact crater. However, indirect lines of evidence are enough to call it a "probable" impact site. It is: 1) presence of deformed sedimentary beds (including the rim consisting of sands mixed with numerous clayey till lenses;, 2) only a small thickness of glacial sediments, 3) simultaneous formation of both structures as showed by radiocarbon dating.
