= Piusa (river) =

River in Estonia

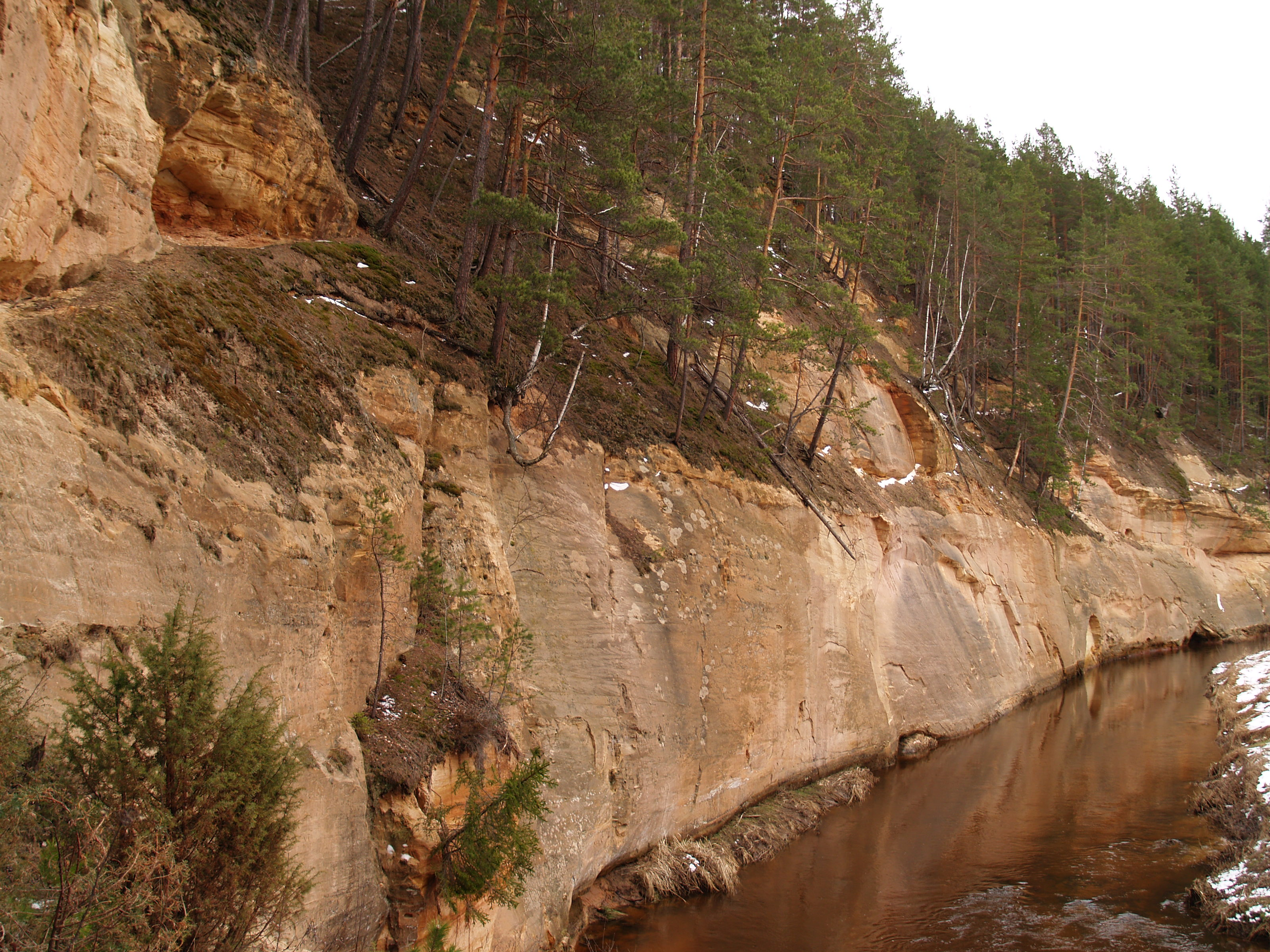
- The Härma rock face on the Piusa

Location
- Countries: Estonia; Russia

Physical characteristics
- Source
  - location: Plaani Külajärv
  - elevation: 244 m (801 ft)
- Mouth: Lake Peipus (Pihkva)
  - coordinates: 57°58′02″N 27°48′57″E
  - elevation: 30 m (98 ft)
- Length: 109 km (68 mi)
- Basin size: 796 km^{2} (307 sq mi)
- Discharge
  - average: 5.5–6.0 m^{3}/s (190–210 cu ft/s)

Basin features
- Progression: Lake Peipus→ Narva→ Gulf of Finland
- Tributaries
  - right: Pelska

The Piusa (Russian: Пиуза Piuza or Пимжа Pimzha) is a river in southeastern Estonia and, for the last 14 km before draining into Lake Pihkva, in Pskov Oblast, Russia. For a 17 km section near Pechory, the Piusa is the border river between Estonia and Russia.

The Piusa has the greatest drop of all Estonian rivers (214 metres) and in the past there were 39 watermills on the river.

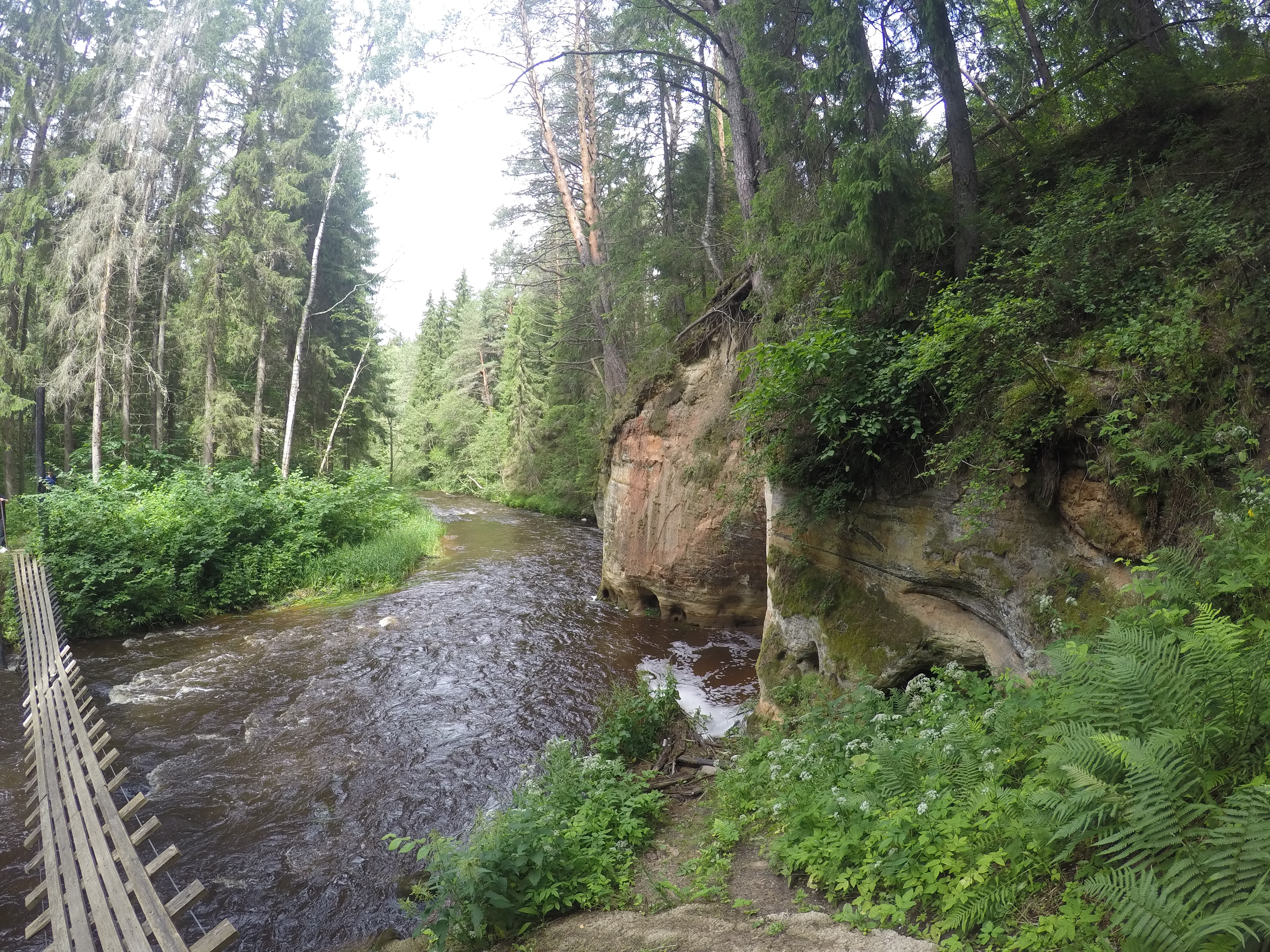
Wooden bridge over Piusa River

== See also ==
- Piusa River Hiking Trail
- Piusa Ancient Valley Holiday Complex
