= Lasva Parish =

Former municipality of Estonia

Coordinates: 57°51′49″N 27°10′39″E

Lasva Parish Lasva vald
- Former municipality of Estonia
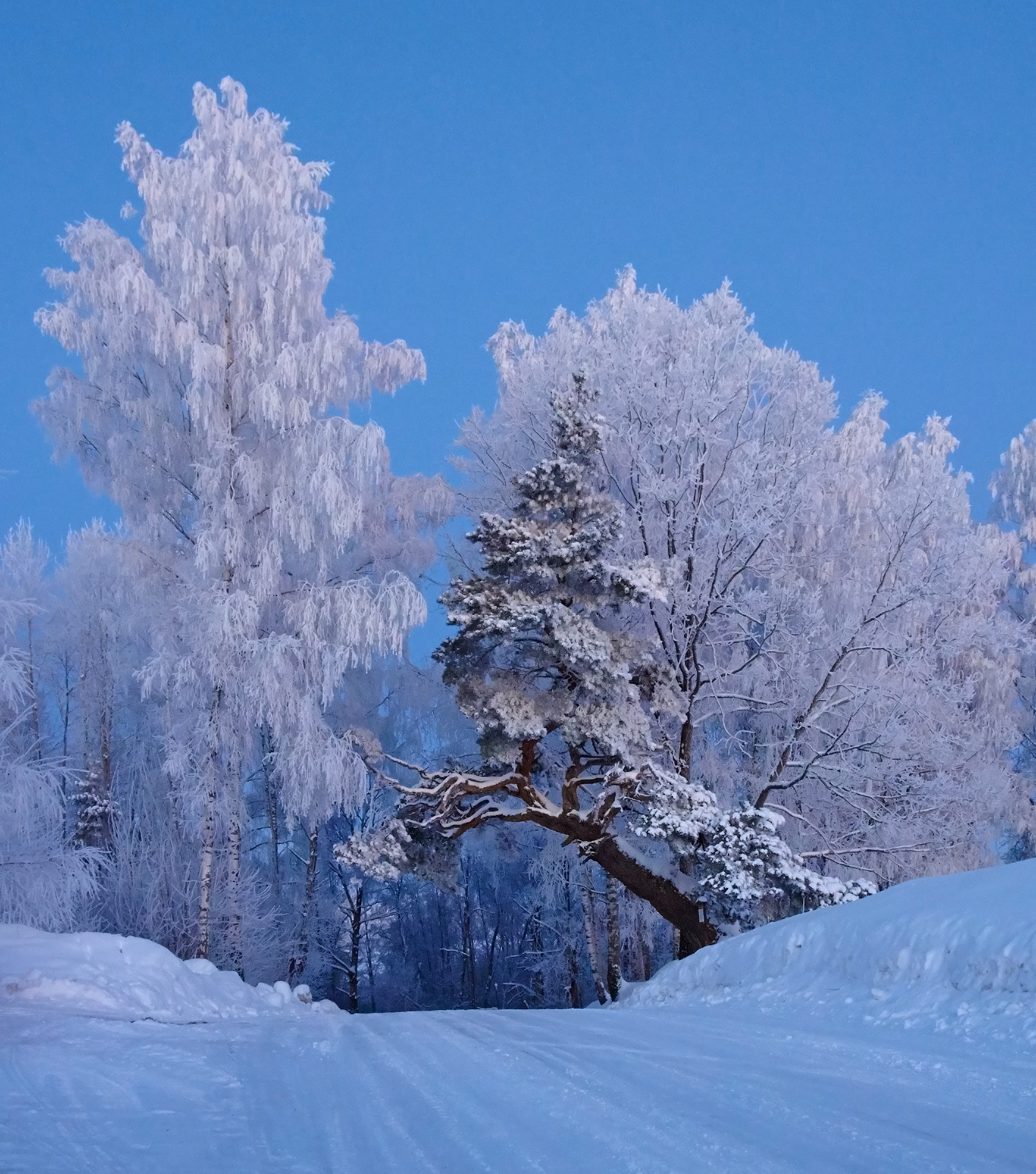

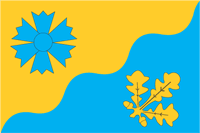
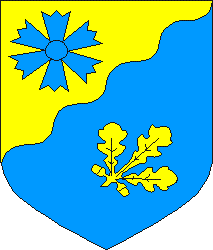
- Flag Coat of arms

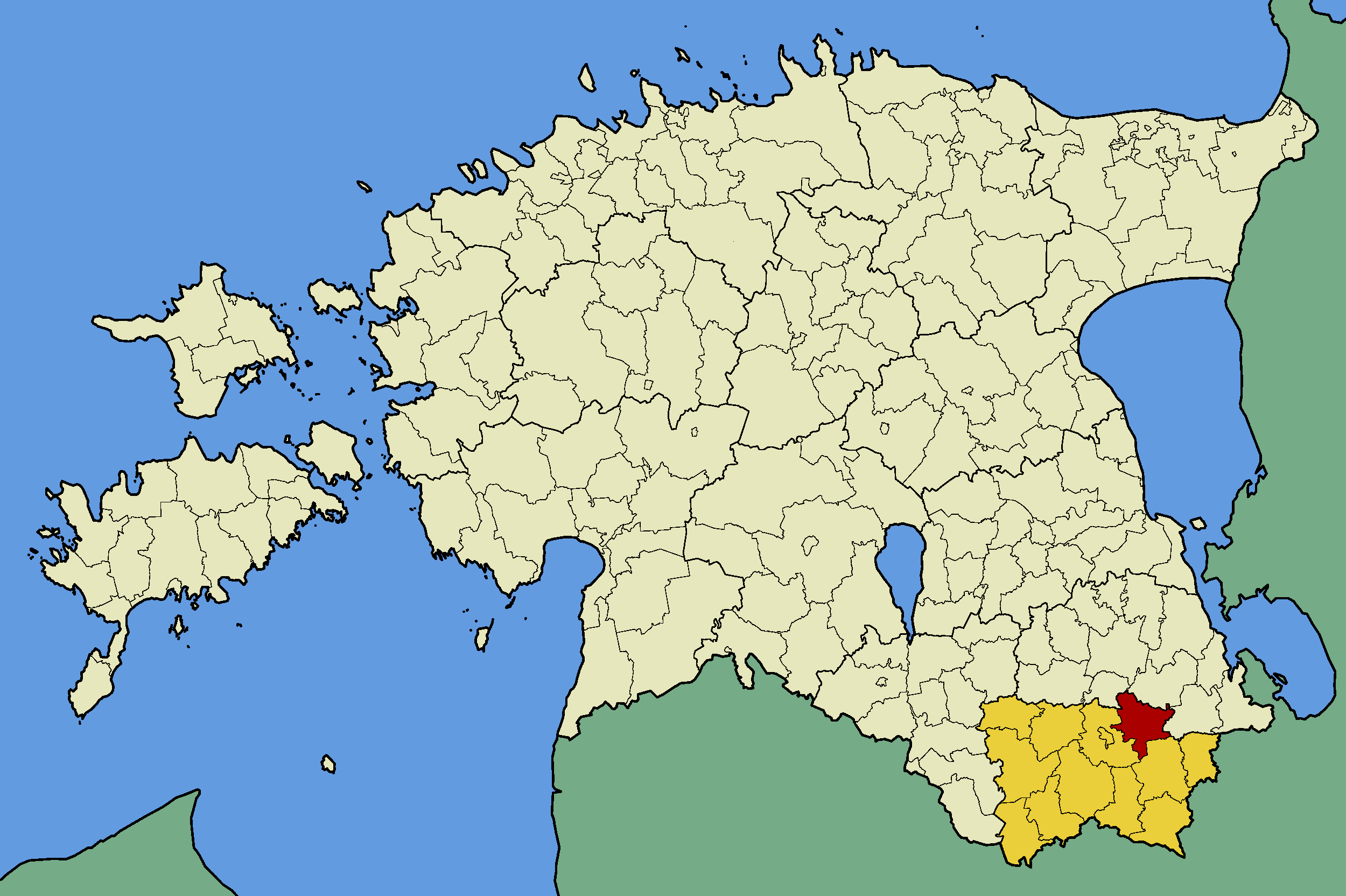
- Lasva Parish within Võru County.
- Country: Estonia
- County: Võru County
- Administrative centre: Lasva

Area
  - Total: 172.1 km^{2} (66.4 sq mi)

Population (01.01.2006)
  - Total: 1,773
  - Density: 10.30/km^{2} (26.68/sq mi)
- Website: www.lasva.ee

Lasva Parish (Estonian: Lasva vald) was a rural municipality in southeastern Estonia. It was a part of Võru County. The municipality had a population of 1,811 (as of 1 October 2007) and covered an area of 172.14 km^{2}, giving it a population density of 10.52 inhabitants/km^{2}.

== Settlements ==
Villages

Andsumäe - Hellekunnu - Husari - Kääpa - Kaku - Kannu - Kõrgessaare - Kühmamäe - Lasva - Lauga - Lehemetsa - Listaku - Madala - Mäessaare - Mõrgi - Nõnova - Noodasküla - Oleski - Otsa - Paidra - Pässä - Peraküla - Pikakannu - Pikasilla - Pille - Pindi - Puusepa - Rusima - Saaremaa - Sooküla - Tammsaare - Tiri - Tohkri - Tsolgo - Tüütsmäe - Villa - Voki-Tamme
