= Lauga =

Lauga may refer to:

== People ==
- Brittany Lauga (born 1986), Australian politician
- Burman Lauga, Australian politician
- Louis Lauga, French politician
- Pierre Lauga, French rugby player
- Romain Lauga, French rugby player

== Places ==
- Lauga, Barinque, France
- Lauga, Estonia
- Lauga, Valli del Pasubio, Italy
