= Voki =

Voki may refer to:

- Voki, Estonia, a village
- Voki-Tamme, a village in Estonia
- Voki Kostić (1931–2010), Serbian composer

== See also ==
- Vokey, a surname
