= Lake Paidra =

Lake in Estonia

- Paidra järv (Estonian)
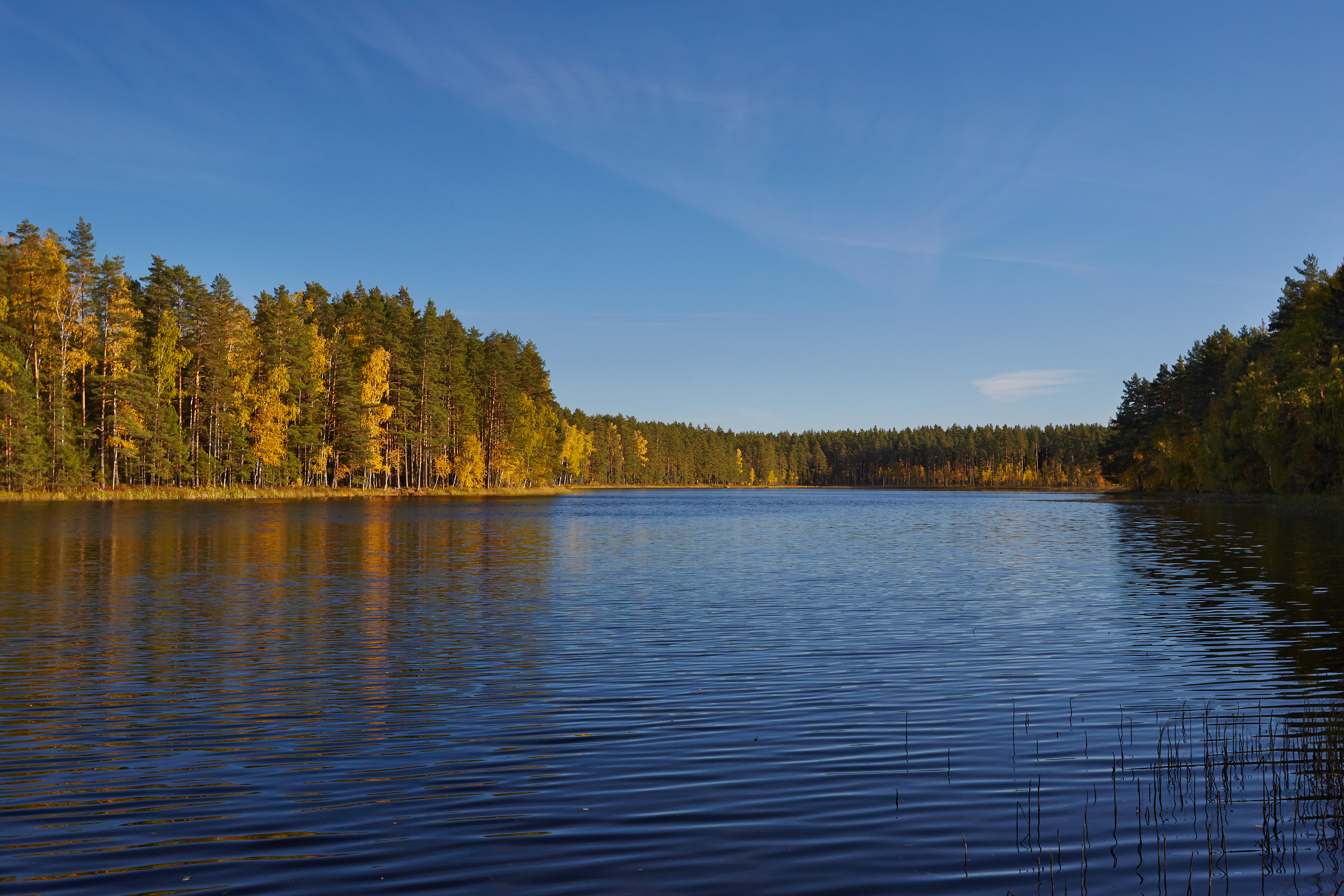

- Location within Estonia
- Coordinates: 57°54′37″N 27°11′21″E
- Basin countries: Estonia
- Max. length: 780 meters (2,560 ft)
- Surface area: 11.3 hectares (28 acres)
- Average depth: 3.7 meters (12 ft)
- Max. depth: 9.8 meters (32 ft)
- Water volume: 411,000 cubic meters (14,500,000 cu ft)
- Shore length^{1}: 1,770 meters (5,810 ft)
- Surface elevation: 70.7 meters (232 ft)
- ^{1} Shore length is not a well-defined measure.

Lake Paidra (Estonian: Paidra järv) is a lake in Estonia. It is mostly located in the village of Paidra in Võru Parish, Võru County, with a smaller part in neighboring Pindi.

== Physical description ==
The lake has an area of 11.3 hectares (28 acres). The lake has an average depth of 3.7 meters (12 ft) and a maximum depth of 9.8 meters (32 ft). It is 780 meters (2,560 ft) long, and its shoreline measures 1,770 meters (5,810 ft). It has a volume of 411,000 cubic meters (14,500,000 cu ft).

== See also ==
- List of lakes in Estonia
