= Timmase Nature Reserve =

Protected area in Estonia

- Location within Estonia
- Location: Estonia
- Coordinates: 57°49′N 26°53′E
- Area: 386 ha (950 acres)
- Established: 2004 (2018)

Timmase Nature Reserve is a nature reserve which is located in Võru County, Estonia.

The area of the nature reserve is 386 ha.

The protected area was founded in 2004 to protect valuable habitat types and threatened species in Juba village (Võru Parish) and Tsirgupalu village (Rõuge Parish).
