= Sooküla =

Sooküla may refer to several places in Estonia:

- Sooküla, Pärnu County, village in Häädemeeste Parish, Pärnu County
- Sooküla, Võru County, village in Lasva Parish, Võru County
