= Morgi =

Morgi may refer to:

- Thomas Morgenstern, Austrian ski jumper
- Morgi, Greater Poland Voivodeship (west-central Poland)
- Morgi, Inowrocław County in Kuyavian-Pomeranian Voivodeship (north-central Poland)
- Morgi, Łódź Voivodeship (central Poland)
- Morgi, Gmina Nasielsk, Nowy Dwór County in Masovian Voivodeship (east-central Poland)
- Morgi, Sokółka County in Podlaskie Voivodeship (north-east Poland)
- Morgi, Suwałki County in Podlaskie Voivodeship (north-east Poland)
- Morgi, Żyrardów County in Masovian Voivodeship (east-central Poland)
- Morgi, Mysłowice in Silesian Voivodeship (south Poland)
- Mõrgi, village in Võru Parish, Võru County, Estonia
- Morgi, Telangana in southern India
