= Noodasjärv =

Lake in Estonia

- Location within Estonia
- Location: Voru County
- Coordinates: 57°49′N 27°10′E
- Basin countries: Estonia
- Max. length: 1,580 meters (5,180 ft)
- Surface area: 30.1 hectares (74 acres)
- Average depth: 2.1 meters (6 ft 11 in)
- Max. depth: 3.2 meters (10 ft)
- Water volume: 566,000 cubic meters (20,000,000 cu ft)
- Shore length^{1}: 3,700 meters (12,100 ft)
- Surface elevation: 72.6 meters (238 ft)
- ^{1} Shore length is not a well-defined measure.

Noodasjärv (also Nuudasjärv or Nadasi järv) is a lake in Estonia. It is located in the village of Noodasküla in Võru Parish, Võru County.

== Physical description ==
The lake has an area of 30.1 hectares (74 acres). The lake has an average depth of 2.1 meters (6 ft 11 in) and a maximum depth of 3.2 meters (10 ft). It is 1,580 meters (5,180 ft) long, and its shoreline measures 3,700 meters (12,100 ft). It has a volume of 566,000 cubic meters (20,000,000 cu ft).

== See also ==
- List of lakes of Estonia
