= Lake Lasva =

Lake in Estonia

- Lasva järv (Estonian)
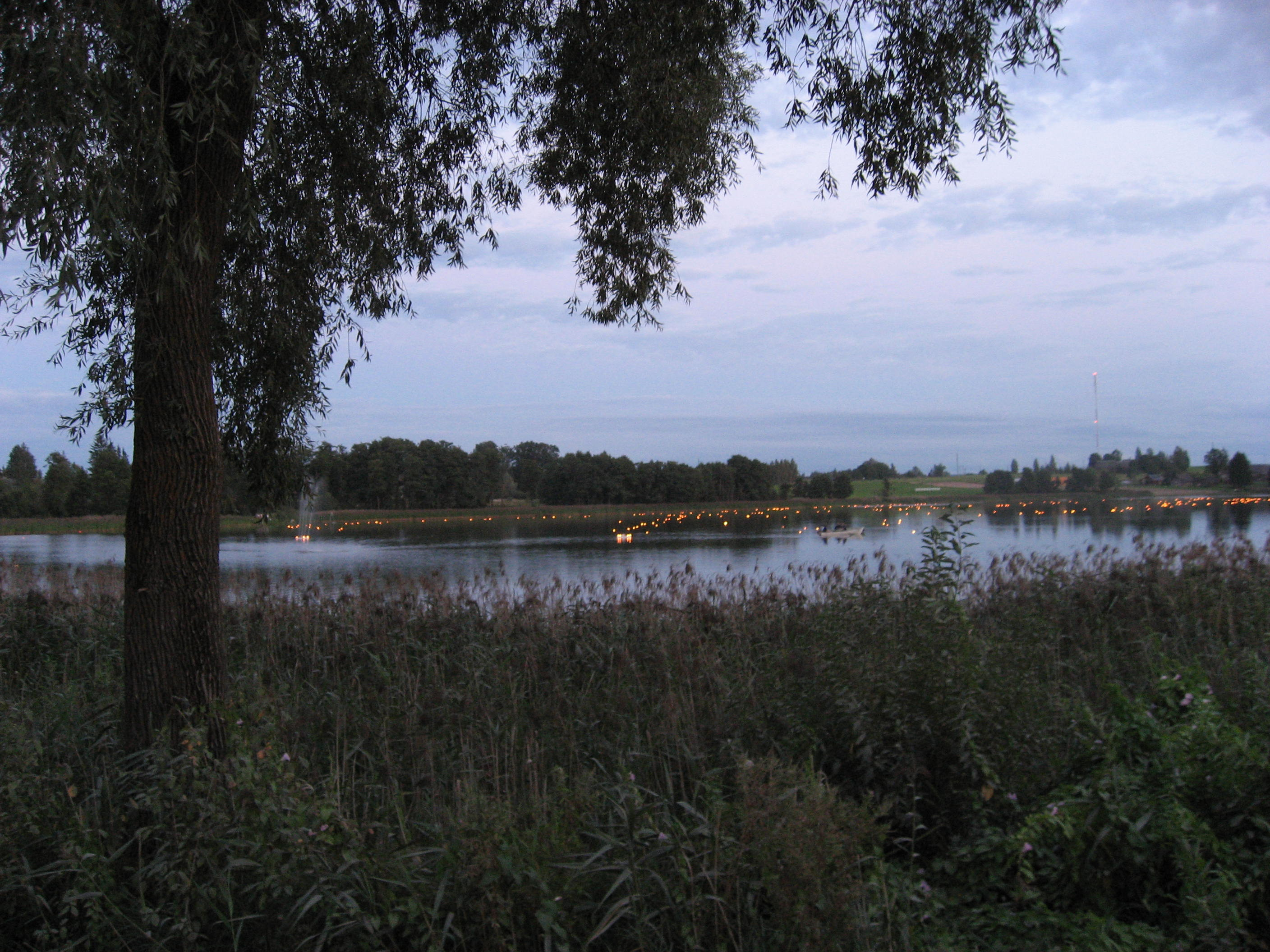
- Lake Lasva in 2007

- Location within Estonia
- Location: Võru Parish, Võru County, Estonia
- Coordinates: 57°51.5′N 27°10.5′E
- Basin countries: Estonia
- Max. length: 680 meters (2,230 ft)
- Surface area: 12.4 hectares (31 acres)
- Average depth: 5.0 meters (16.4 ft)
- Max. depth: 19.2 meters (63 ft)
- Water volume: 545,000 cubic meters (19,200,000 cu ft)
- Shore length^{1}: 1,670 meters (5,480 ft)
- Surface elevation: 71.8 meters (236 ft)
- ^{1} Shore length is not a well-defined measure.

Lake Lasva (Estonian: Lasva järv) is a lake in Estonia. It is located in the village of Lasva in Võru Parish, Võru County.

== Physical description ==
The lake has an area of 12.4 hectares (31 acres). The lake has an average depth of 5.0 meters (16.4 ft) and a maximum depth of 19.2 meters (63 ft). It is 680 meters (2,230 ft) long, and its shoreline measures 1,670 meters (5,480 ft). It has a volume of 545,000 cubic meters (19,200,000 cu ft).

== See also ==
- List of lakes of Estonia
