= Tammsaare, Võru County =

Village in Estonia

Tammsaare Tammõsaarõ (in Võro)
- Village
- Location in Estonia
- Coordinates: 57°50′42″N 27°11′25″E
- Country: Estonia
- County: Võru County
- Municipality: Võru Parish

Area
  - Total: 1.2 km^{2} (0.46 sq mi)

Population (2011)
  - Total: 26
  - Density: 22/km^{2} (56/sq mi)

Tammsaare (Võro: Tammõsaarõ) is a village in Võru Parish, Võru County in southeastern Estonia. It has a population of 26 (as of 2011) and an area of 1.2 square kilometers (0.46 sq mi).

== Name ==
The name Tammsaare literally means 'oak island'. During the tsarist era, Lasva Parish was known as a place where people could buy wheel spokes and oak wood for making spokes. Folk tradition states that a sparse oak grove grew in the southern part of the lands belonging to Lasva Manor, where the crofters’ plots of the Sooküla farms were also located on detached parcels. When the manor land surrounding the farms was divided into family-owned farms in the 1920s, a village name related to the oaks (Estonian: tamm) was chosen. The second part of the name, saar (genitive: saare, usually 'island') means 'island of woods' in this case; that is, a patch of forested land between fields.

== Geography ==
The railway from Valga to Pechory passes the village on its southern side.
