= Saaremaa (disambiguation) =

Saaremaa is an island in the Baltic Sea belonging to Estonia. Saaremaa may also refer to:

- Saare County (Saare maakond / Saaremaa), one of the 15 counties of Estonia, consisting of Saaremaa island and neighbouring islands
- Saaremaa Parish (Saaremaa vald), one of the 3 municipalities of Saare County, covering the whole Saaremaa island and some smaller neighbouring islets
- Saaremaa, Võru County, village in Võru Parish, Võru County, Estonia
- 4163 Saaremaa, main-belt asteroid
- Saaremaa virus, type of Hantavirus
