= Lompka =

Village in Estonia

- Location within Estonia
- Coordinates: 57°47′13″N 26°55′54″E
- Country: Estonia
- County: Võru County
- Municipality: Võru Parish
- Demonym: Lompkan
- Time zone: UTC+02:00 (EET)
  - Summer (DST): UTC+03:00 (EEST)

Lompka is a village in Estonia, in Võru Parish, which belongs to Võru County.
