= Nooska =

Village in Estonia

- Location within Estonia
- Coordinates: 57°46′39″N 26°56′49″E
- Country: Estonia
- County: Võru County
- Municipality: Võru Parish

Nooska is a village in Estonia, in Võru Parish, which belongs to Võru County.
