= Puusepp =

Family name

Puusepp is an Estonian surname meaning 'carpenter' (literally, 'wood-smith') and may refer to the following individuals:

- Edgar Puusepp (1911–1982), Estonian wrestler
- Endel Puusepp (1909–1996), Estonian Soviet-era World War II pilot
- Ludvig Puusepp (1875–1942), Estonian surgeon, researcher and the world's first professor of neurosurgery
- Markus Puusepp (born 1986), Estonian orienteering competitor
- Priidu Puusepp (1887–1972), Estonian educator and linguist
- Raivo Puusepp (born 1960), Estonian architect

== See also ==
- Puusepa, Võru County
- Puusepa, Harju County
