= Kääpa =

Kääpa may refer to several places in Estonia:

- Kääpa, Jõgeva County, village in Estonia
- Kääpa, Võru County, village in Estonia
