= Käätso =

Village in Estonia

- Location within Estonia
- Coordinates: 57°47′34″N 27°56′58″E
- Country: Estonia
- County: Võru County
- Municipality: Võru Parish

Käätso is a village in Estonia, in Võru Parish, Võru County.
