= Kärnamäe =

Village in Estonia

- Location within Estonia
- Coordinates: 57°54′16″N 27°01′20″E
- Country: Estonia
- County: Võru County
- Municipality: Võru Parish

Kärnamäe is a village in Estonia, in Võru Parish, which belongs to Võru County.
