= Women in Estonia =

General statistics
- Maternal mortality (per 100,000): 5 (2020)
- Women in parliament: 20.8% (2013)
- Women over 25 with secondary education: 100% (2012)
- Women in labour force: 71.9% (employment rate OECD definition, 2019)

Gender Inequality Index
- Value: 0.100 (2021)
- Rank: 28th out of 191

Global Gender Gap Index
- Value: 0.733 (2022)
- Rank: 52nd out of 146

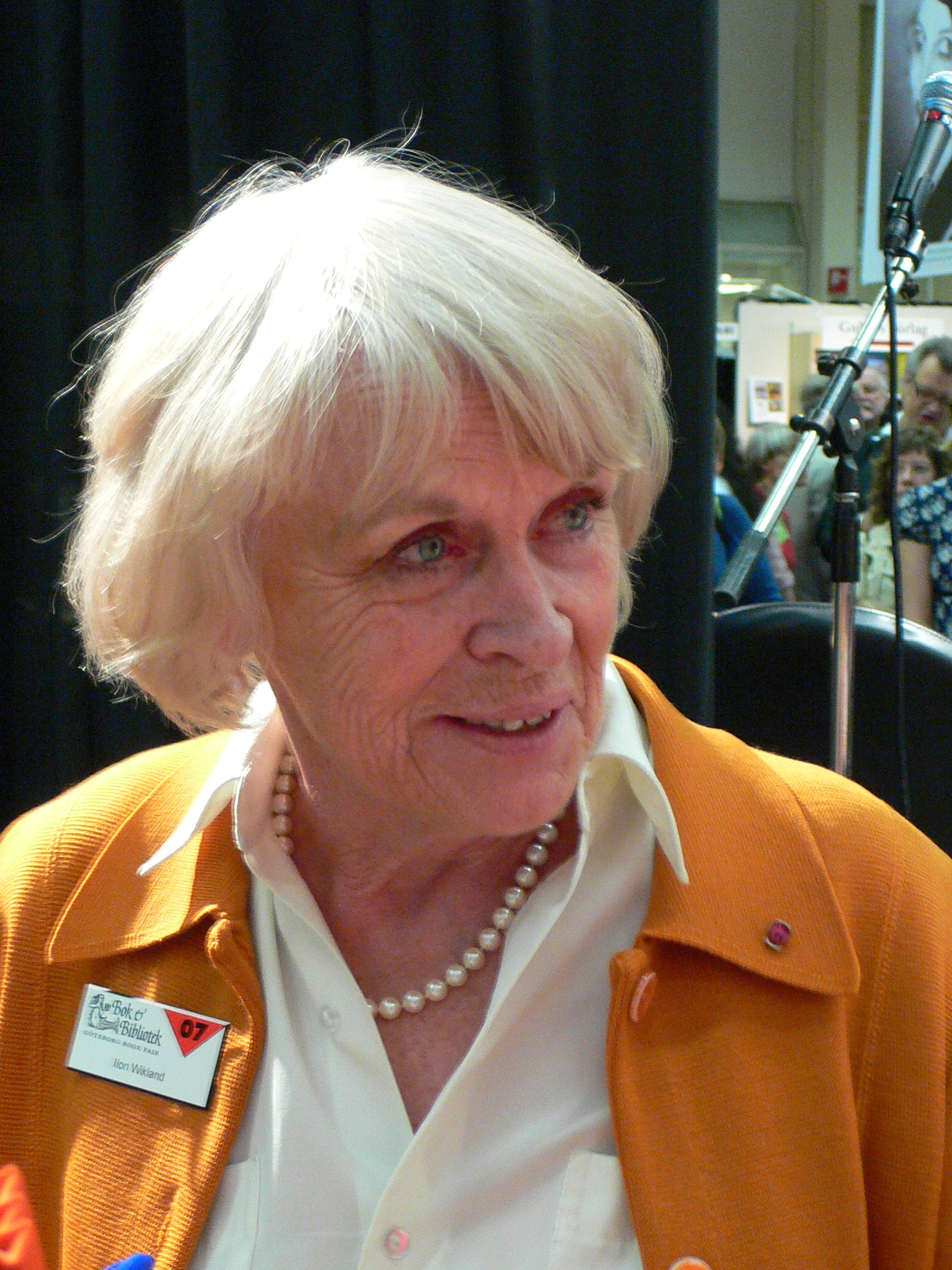
Ilon Wikland was the author behind the drawings in books by Astrid Lindgren

Women in Estonia are women who were born in, who live in, or are from Estonia in Europe.

== Politics ==
Estonian women first gained the right to vote in 24 February 1918 when Estonia gained independence from Russia.

On 26 January 2021, Kaja Kallas became the first female prime minister of Estonia.

== Fertility ==
Between 1970 and 1990, the total fertility rate (TFR - the average number of children a woman bears) of Estonian women was little over 2 children born per woman. A fast decrease of the TFR occurred after independence. In 1998 the lowest rate was recorded: 1.28 children born per women. In 2001, the United Nations reported through its annual world-population report that "Estonia was one of the fastest-shrinking nations on earth, at risk of losing nearly half its 1.4 million people by mid-century". To prevent this drop in TFR, one of the steps the Estonian government took since 2004 was to start "paying" women by providing them with subsidies "to have babies" known as "mother's salary". After giving birth and during maternity leave, working Estonian women received full monthly income for up to 15 months (equivalent to US$1,560.00); non-working women who gave birth received a monthly subsidy equivalent to US$200.00. The TFR slightly recovered in the subsequent years, but fluctuated by year, and continued to remain below the replacement rate (being 1.54 children/woman in 2014). As in many other European countries, the link between marriage and fertility has been weakened during the past decades: most children today are born outside of marriage (59% of children were born to unmarried women in 2014). The average age of mothers at first birth in 2014 was 26.6 years.

== Religion ==
In the past, according to Estonian mythology, the ancient women of Estonia believed in the female deity and protector of pregnant women in labor known as Rõugutaja.

First woman cleric Laine Villenthal was ordinated in 1967 by Estonian Evangelical Lutheran Church.

== See also ==
- Women in Europe
