= Pikasilla =

Pikasilla may refer to several places in Estonia:

- Pikasilla, Valga County, village in Põdrala Parish, Valga County
- Pikasilla, Võru County, village in Lasva Parish, Võru County
