= Peraküla =

Peraküla may refer to several places in Estonia:

- Peraküla, Lääne County, village in Lääne-Nigula Parish, Lääne County
- Peraküla, Võru County, village in Võru Parish, Võru County
