= Hannuste =

Village in Võru, Estonia

- Location within Estonia
- Coordinates: 57°46′06″N 27°01′05″E
- Country: Estonia
- County: Võru County
- Municipality: Võru Parish

Hannuste is a village in Estonia, in Võru Parish, which belongs to Võru County.
