= Lake Loosu =

Lake in Estonia

- Loosu järv (Estonian)
- Location within Estonia
- Coordinates: 57°53′0″N 26°59′33″E
- Basin countries: Estonia
- Max. length: 760 meters (2,490 ft)
- Surface area: 6.0 hectares (15 acres)
- Average depth: 2.1 meters (6 ft 11 in)
- Max. depth: 4.3 meters (14 ft)
- Shore length^{1}: 1,800 meters (5,900 ft)
- Surface elevation: 73.1 meters (240 ft)
- ^{1} Shore length is not a well-defined measure.

Lake Loosu (Estonian: Loosu järv) is a lake in southeastern Estonia. It is located in the village of Loosu in Võru Parish, Võru County.

== Physical description ==
The lake has an area of 6.0 hectares (15 acres). The lake has an average depth of 2.1 meters (6 ft 11 in) and a maximum depth of 4.3 meters (14 ft). It is 760 meters (2,490 ft) long, and its shoreline measures 1,800 meters (5,900 ft).

== See also ==
- List of lakes of Estonia
