= August Sabbe =

Estonian anti-communist, Forest Brother

- Born: 1 September 1909; Paidra, Kreis Werro, Governorate of Livonia, Russian Empire
- Died: 28 September 1978 (aged 69); Paidra, Lasva Parish, then part of Estonian SSR, Soviet Union
- Occupation: partisan

August Sabbe (1 September 1909 – 28 September 1978) was one of the last surviving Estonian members of the Forest Brothers, a group of citizens of Estonia, Latvia and Lithuania who resisted and fought against the Soviet occupation of their three nations. Sabbe hid in the forests of Estonia, living off of the land like other Forest Brethren.

In 1978, at the age of 69, Sabbe was found near his birthplace of Paidra, Lasva Parish in southeastern Estonia by two KGB agents posing as fishermen. When they attempted to arrest him, he leaped into the Võhandu River and either drowned accidentally or deliberately wedged himself under a submerged log. The KGB, which took photographs before and after the attempted arrest, maintained that Sabbe drowned while attempting to escape. But some have observed that the river is narrow, sluggish and shallow at that point, an unlikely place for an accidental drowning, and that the open field on the opposite bank and the river's lazy loops gave an elderly man no place to flee from two young, physically fit pursuers. The Forest Brethren's code of conduct and the quickness of Sabbe's reaction suggest that Sabbe was prepared not to be taken alive.

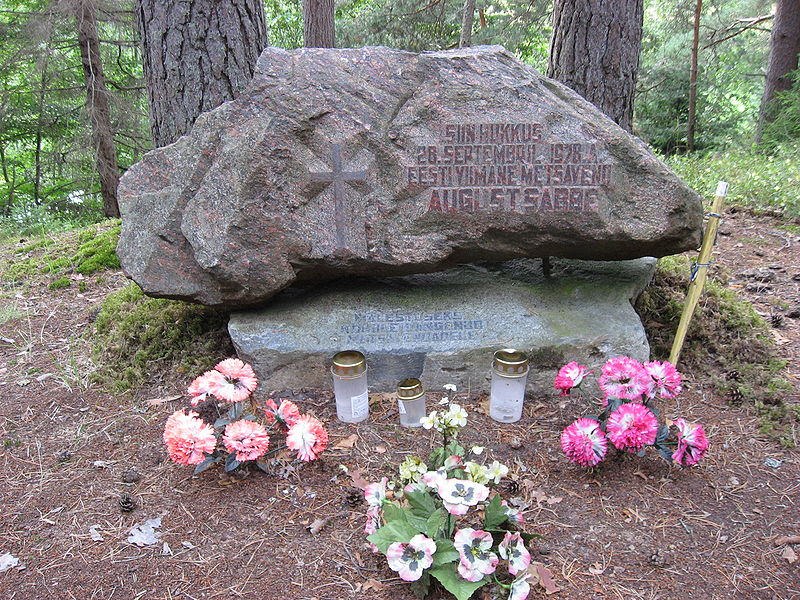
August Sabbe's death place monument, near river Võhandu, Paidra, Estonia, 2008, Estonian inscription: Here on 28 September 1978 perished the last Estonian soldier of Forest Brothers August Sabbe

A stone monument to Sabbe stands in a pine grove overlooking the site of his death. It is located just west of Route 65 between Leevi and Tsolgo, almost exactly on the boundary between Põlva and Võru counties.

== See also ==
- Józef Franczak, the last anti-communist fighter in Poland (died 1963)
- Kalev Arro, Forest Brothers member (died 1974)
- Ion Gavrilă Ogoranu, Romanian anti-communist fighter
