= Loosu =

Village in Estonia

- Village
- Location in Estonia
- Coordinates: 57°53′06″N 26°59′30″E
- Country: Estonia
- County: Võru County
- Municipality: Võru Parish

Population
  - Total: 195

Loosu (German: Loso) is a village in Võru Parish, Võru County in southeastern Estonia. It has a population of 195.

== See also ==
- Lake Loosu
