= Madala =

Madala may refer to:

== Places ==
- Madala, Andhra Pradesh, a village in Andhra Pradesh, India
- Madala Ooru, a village in Karnataka, India
- Madala, Estonia, a village in Võru County, Estonia

== History ==
- Madala Panji, a chronicle of the Jagannath Temple, Puri, Odisha, India

== People ==
- Madala Kunene (born 1951), South African musician
- Madala Masuku (born 1965), South African government official
- Madala Ranga Rao (1948–2018), Indian film actor and producer
- Madala Ravi (active from 1981), Indian actor and film producer
- Tholie Madala (1937–2010), South African judge
