= Andsumäe =

Andsumäe may refer to:

- Andsumäe, Rõuge Parish, village in Võru County, Estonia
- Andsumäe, Võru Parish, village in Võru County, Estonia
