= Meeliku =

Village in Estonia

- Location within Estonia
- Coordinates: 57°47′06″N 26°59′09″E
- Country: Estonia
- County: Võru County
- Municipality: Võru Parish

Meeliku is a village in Estonia, in Võru Parish, which belongs to Võru County.
