= OTSA =

OTSA can stand for:

- Oklahoma Tribal Statistical Area
- Orthodox Theological Society in America

== See also ==
- Otsa, a village in Estonia
