= Husari =

Village in Estonia

- village
- Location in Estonia
- Coordinates: 57°50′37″N 27°10′02″E
- Country: Estonia
- County: Võru County
- Municipality: Võru Parish

Area
  - Total: 2.3 km^{2} (0.89 sq mi)

Population (2011)
  - Total: 17
  - Density: 7.4/km^{2} (19/sq mi)

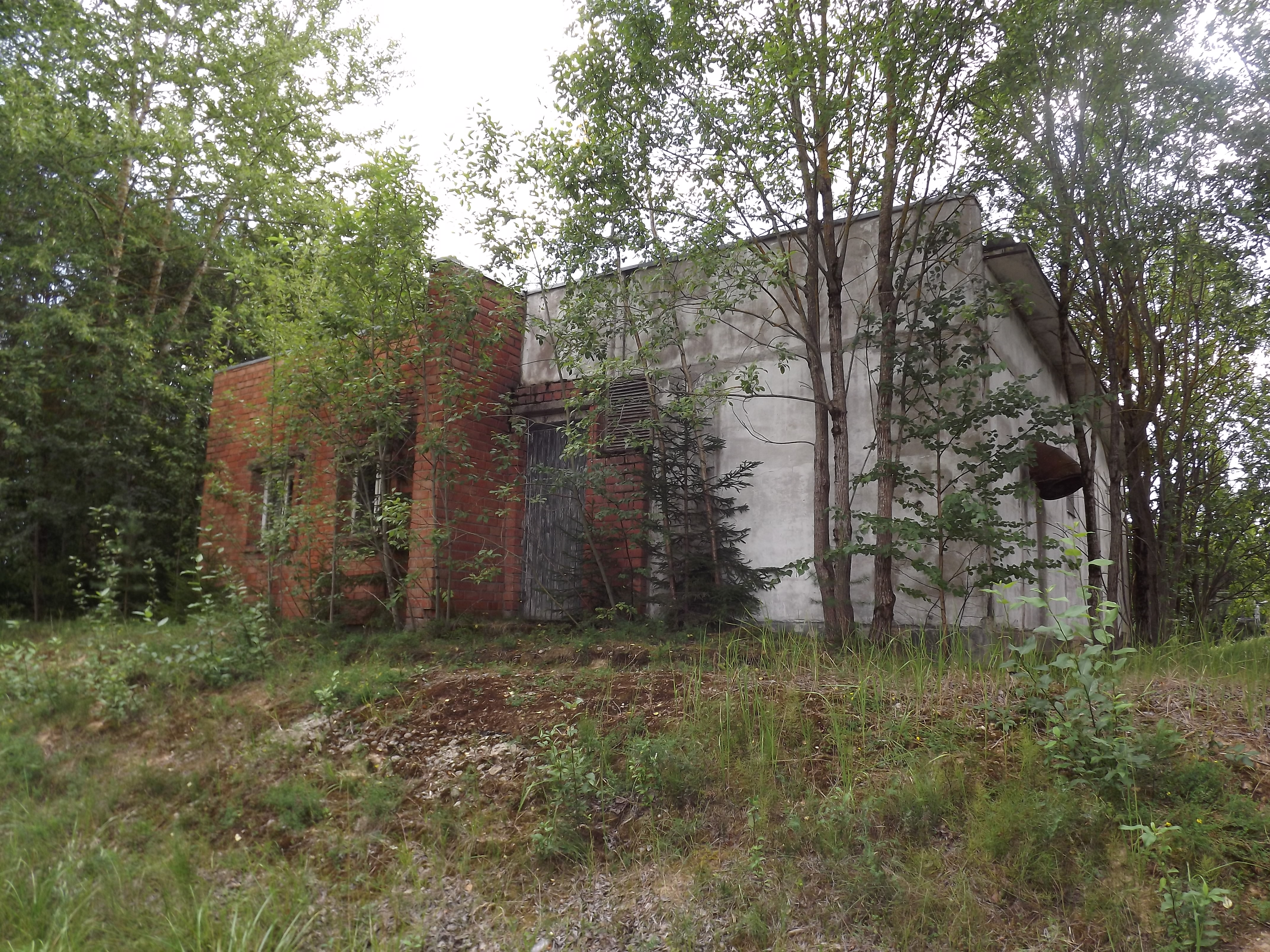
A building in Husari

Husari is a village in Võru Parish, Võru County, in southeastern Estonia. It has a population of 17 (as of 2011) and an area of 2.3 km^{2}.

Husari has a station on currently inactive Valga–Pechory railway.
