= Nõnova =

Village in Estonia

- village
- Location in Estonia
- Coordinates: 57°50′00″N 27°08′06″E
- Country: Estonia
- County: Võru County
- Municipality: Võru Parish

Area
  - Total: 4.1 km^{2} (1.6 sq mi)

Population (2011)
  - Total: 32
  - Density: 7.8/km^{2} (20/sq mi)

Nõnova is a village in Võru Parish, Võru County, in southeastern Estonia, located about 8 km east of the town of Võru. It has a population of 32 (as of 2011) and an area of 4.1 km^{2}.

Nõnova has a station on currently inactive Valga–Pechory railway.
