= Teet Helm =

Estonian politician

Teet Helm (born 8 December 1959 in Võru Parish) is an Estonian politician. He was a member of IX Riigikogu.

From 2005 until 2016, he was the mayor of Räpina and has been the mayor of Võnnu.
