= Oleski =

Village in Estonia

Oleski Olõski (in Võro)
- Village
- Location in Estonia
- Coordinates: 57°55′39″N 27°04′09″E
- Country: Estonia
- County: Võru County
- Municipality: Võru Parish

Area
  - Total: 4.3 km^{2} (1.7 sq mi)

Population
  - Total: 17
  - Density: 4.0/km^{2} (10/sq mi)

Oleski (Võro: Olõski) is a village in Võru Parish, Võru County in southeastern Estonia. It has a population of 17 and an area of 4.3 km^{2}.
