= Alajärv (Väimela) =

Lake in eastern Estonia

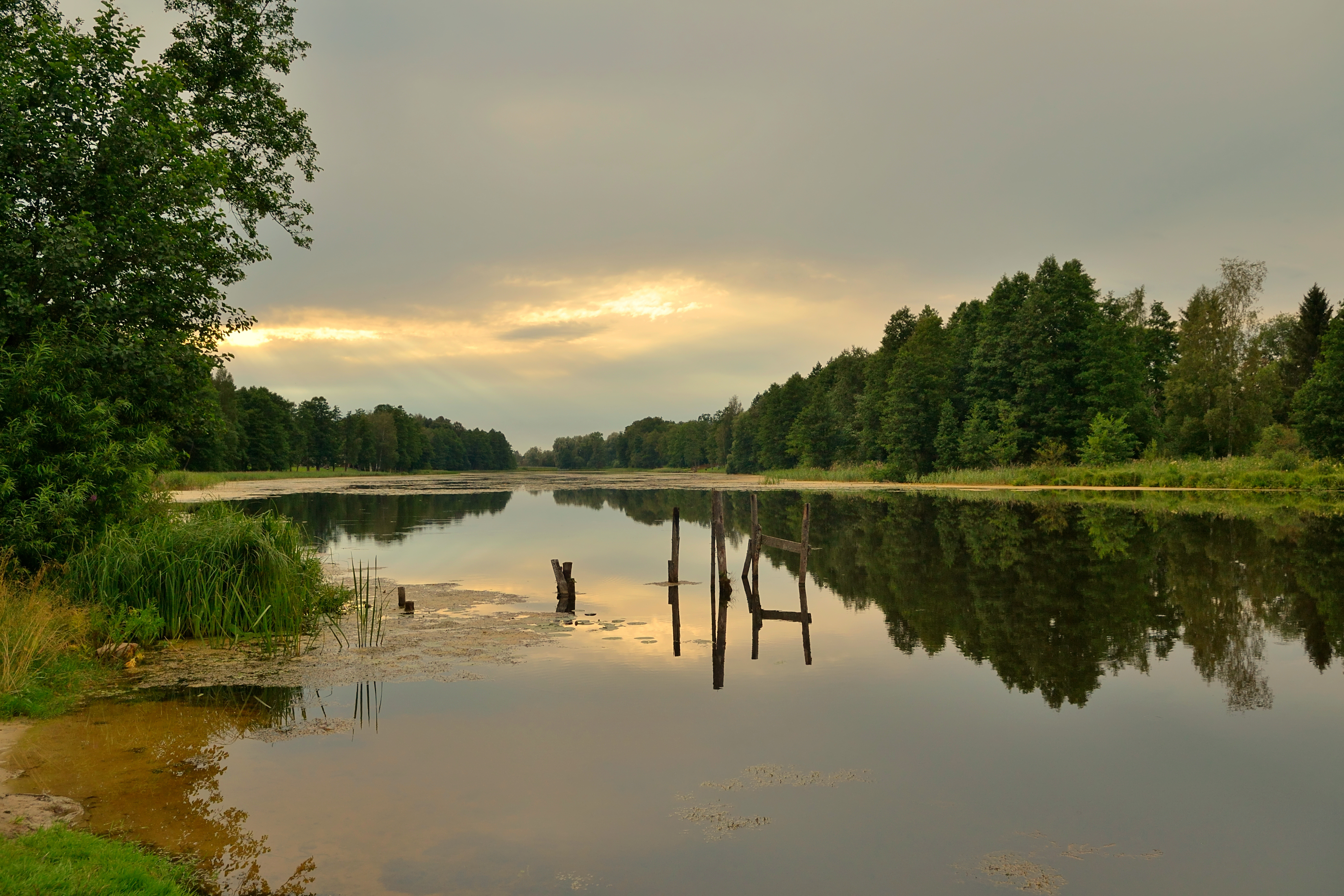

- Location within Estonia
- Location: Võru County
- Coordinates: 57°53′23″N 27°01′20″E
- Basin countries: Estonia
- Max. length: 880 meters (2,890 ft)
- Surface area: 7.8 hectares (19 acres)
- Average depth: 1.6 meters (5 ft 3 in)
- Max. depth: 2.5 meters (8 ft 2 in)
- Shore length^{1}: 2,030 meters (6,660 ft)
- Surface elevation: 72.8 meters (239 ft)
- ^{1} Shore length is not a well-defined measure.

Alajärv (also known as Väimela Alajärv or Väike Väimela järv) is a lake in Estonia. It is located in the settlement of Väimela in Võru Parish, Võru County.

== Physical description ==
The lake has an area of 7.8 hectares (19 acres). The lake has an average depth of 1.6 meters (5 ft 3 in) and a maximum depth of 2.5 meters (8 ft 2 in). It is 880 meters (2,890 ft) long, and its shoreline measures 2,030 meters (6,660 ft).

== See also ==
- List of lakes of Estonia
