= Tiri, Estonia =

Village in Estonia

Tiri
- Village
- Location in Estonia
- Coordinates: 57°49′54″N 27°14′08″E
- Country: Estonia
- County: Võru County
- Municipality: Võru Parish

Area
  - Total: 4.8 km^{2} (1.9 sq mi)

Population
  - Total: 12
  - Density: 2.5/km^{2} (6.5/sq mi)

Tiri is a village in Võru Parish, Võru County in southeastern Estonia. It has a population of 12 and an area of 4.8 km^{2}.

== History ==
Tiri was a farm on the estate of Bentenhof (Pindi) and was successively called Thiry Martt (1627), Tiro Mertt (1630), Tyri Mert (1638), and Tiry Peter or Tiry Hint (1684). By 1688, Tiri had become a village under the name Tirrikylla, and by 1765, it was referred to as Dorf Tirri. Between 1977 and 1997, the village was part of the neighboring village Otsa.
