= Juba, Estonia =

Village in Estonia

Juba
- village
- Location in Estonia
- Coordinates: 57°49′28″N 26°56′57″E
- Country: Estonia
- County: Võru County
- Municipality: Võru Parish

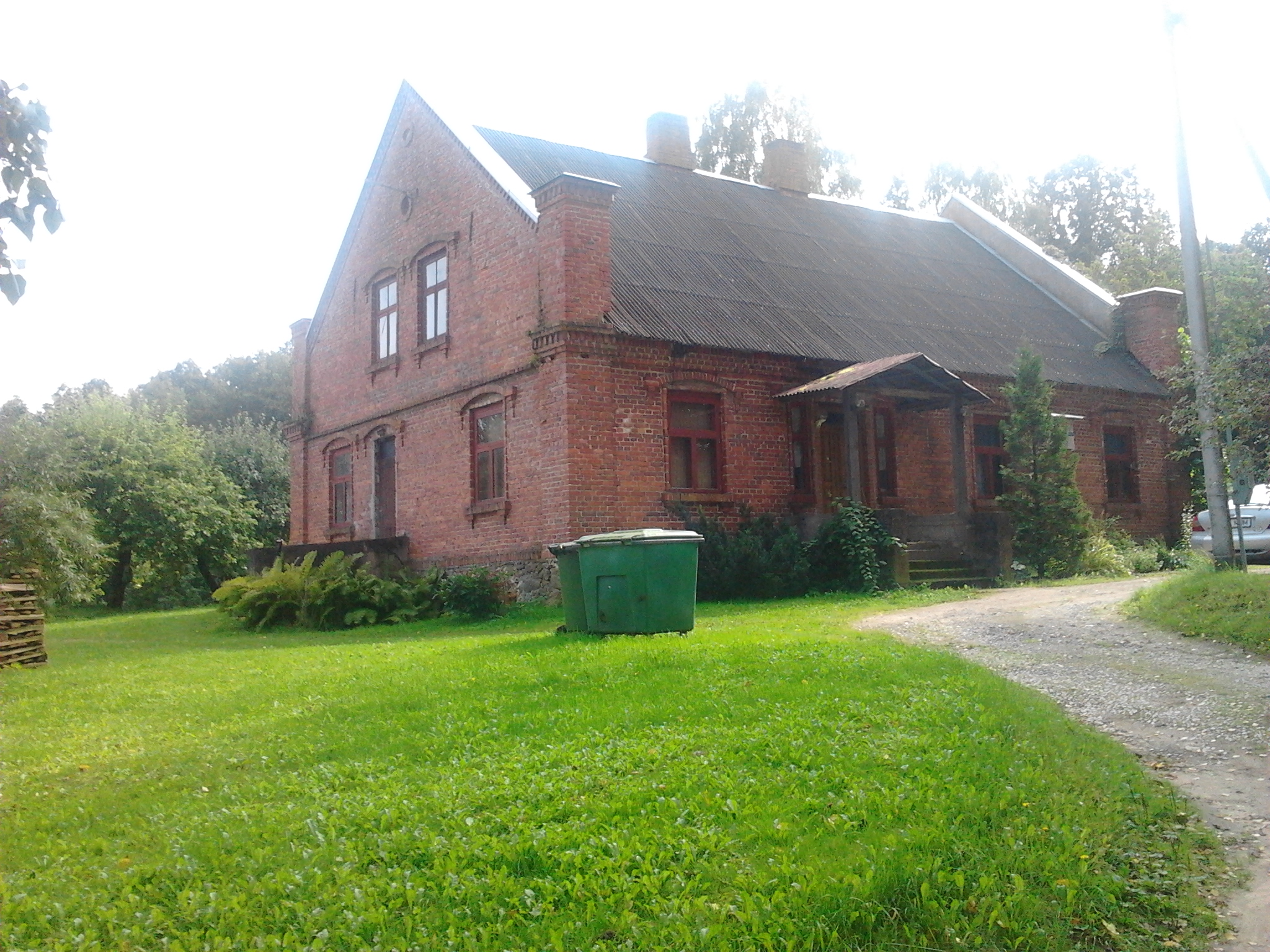
The main building of Juba Manor

Juba is a village in Võru Parish, Võru County, in southeastern Estonia, located about 4 km southwest of the town of Võru. It borders the Lake Vagula in the north.

The inactive Valga–Pechory railway passes through Juba before the Lake Vagula, there's a station named "Vagula".

Tsiatsungõlmaa training area, used by the Estonian Defence Forces is located in Juba village.
