= Pikakannu =

Village in Estonia

- Village
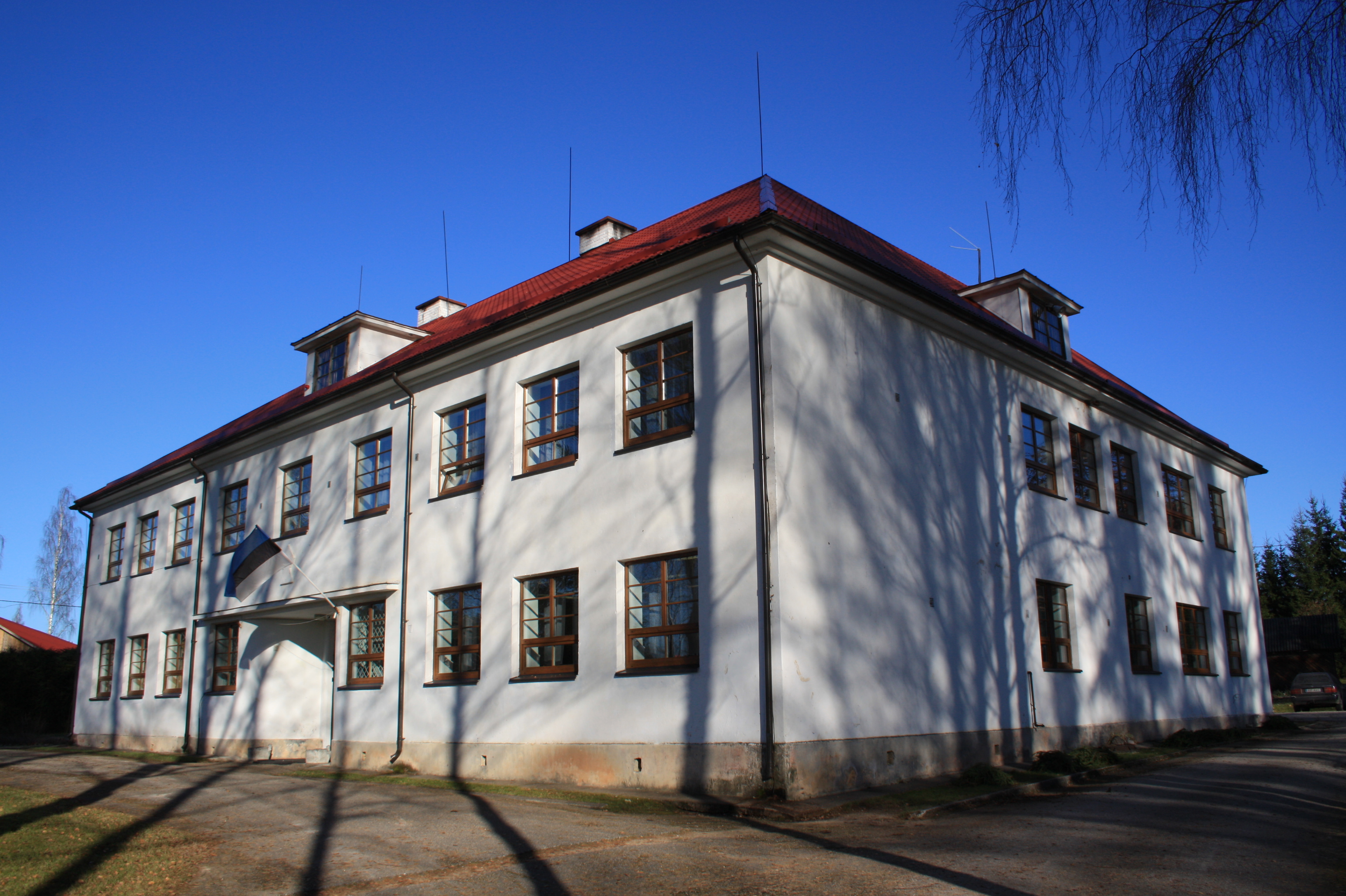
- Pikakannu basic school

- Location within Estonia
- Coordinates: 57.8719°N 27.2428°E
- Country: Estonia
- County: Võru County
- Parish: Võru Parish
- Time zone: UTC+2 (EET)
  - Summer (DST): UTC+3 (EEST)

Pikakannu is a village in Võru Parish, Võru County in Estonia.
