= Pille, Võru County =

Village in Estonia

Pille
- Village
- Location in Estonia
- Coordinates: 57°55′52″N 27°06′33″E
- Country: Estonia
- County: Võru County
- Municipality: Võru Parish

Pille is a village in Võru Parish, Võru County in southeastern Estonia.
