= Kalev Arro =

Estonian anti-Soviet partisan

- Born: 15 July 1915; Valgjärve Parish, Governorate of Livonia, Russian Empire
- Died: 2 June 1974 (aged 58); Valgjärve Parish, Estonia
- Cause of death: Gunshot wounds
- Other names: Värdi, Jakob, Lihunik
- Occupation: Partisan
- Years active: 1944–1974

Kalev Gustav Arro (17 July 1915 – 2 June 1974) was an Estonian partisan during the Soviet occupation of Estonia. He was part of the Forest Brothers (Metsavennad), a group of resistance fighters who hid in the forests of Estonia, Latvia, and Lithuania in the struggle against Soviet authority. He is noted for disguising himself as a vagrant for 30 years to evade capture.

== Biography ==
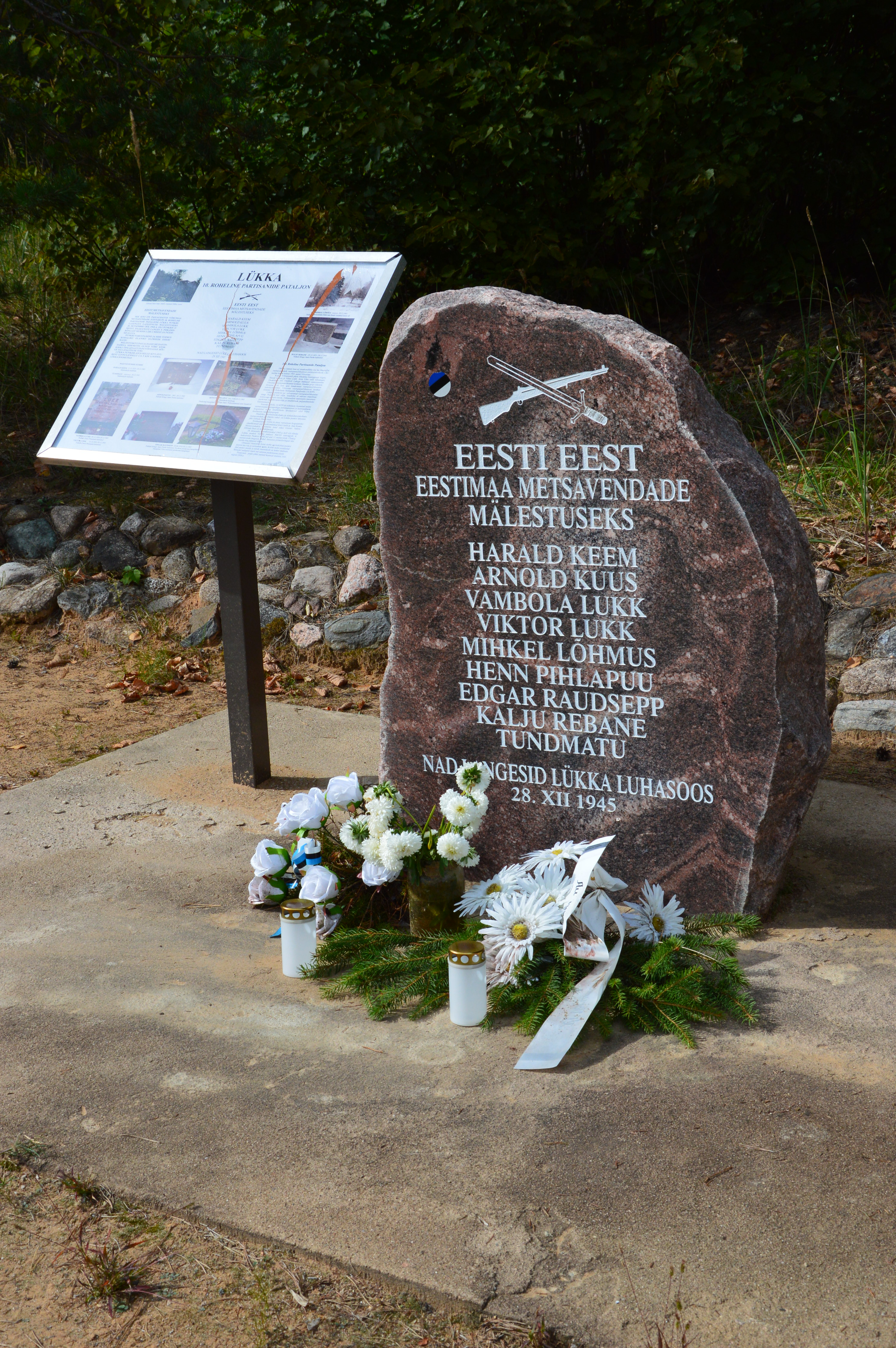
A memorial to the Estonian partisans who died in Võru County.

Arro and fellow partisans hid in bunkers in southern Estonian forests. One of these was the Hallipalu bunker in Põlva County, which bunker partner Artur Kittus said was considered by his comrades as the Republic of Estonia. Contemporaneous Soviet documents frequently mentioned Arro and his comrades and was part of the narrative that branded their struggle as Estonian bandit activity. In an account, he was cited as part of the group who encountered a Soviet raiding on 24 September 1949. In this report, his name was crossed out as one of the casualties. Witnesses, however, stated that he broke through the siege and the report crossed his name out in the attempt to cover failure.

Arro was shot dead in the summer of 1974 by Soviet authorities during an exchange of gunfire. There is some confusion about precisely where Arro was killed. Some sources state it was in Võrumaa. Other sources state that it was in Valgjärve Parish (present-day Kanepi Parish), Põlva County, near Saverna. Politician and diplomat Eerik-Niiles Kross states that Arro's death took place in the village of Kooraste in Valgjärve Parish.

There are varying reports as to the year of his death with some citing 1976 and 1978. Although most Estonian accounts give the date as 2 July 1974. An account stated that he exchanged fire with KGB agents sometime during the decline of their guerrilla resistance after Kim Philby infiltrated the Forest Brothers. He was one of the last remaining Forest Brothers along with partisan August Sabbe, who drowned or, as some sources say, committed suicide rather than be captured in 1978.

Arro was buried at Tartu Raadi Cemetery, where he was honored with a memorial. Little is known about Arro and other partisans because Soviet authorities suppressed discussions of the resistance. Those who sympathized with the Forest Brothers were repressed and deported.

== See also ==
- August Sabbe
- Józef Franczak
- Ion Gavrilă Ogoranu
