= Villa, Võru Parish =

Village in Estonia

Villa
- Village
- Location in Estonia
- Coordinates: 57°51′49″N 27°02′27″E
- Country: Estonia
- County: Võru County
- Municipality: Võru Parish

Area
  - Total: 1.2 km^{2} (0.46 sq mi)

Population
  - Total: 16
  - Density: 13/km^{2} (35/sq mi)

Villa is a village in Võru Parish, Võru County in southeastern Estonia. It has a population of 16 and an area of 1.2 km^{2}.
