= Yelgoi =

- Village
- Sangareddy Revenue Division: Manoor
- State: Telangana
- District: Sangareddy

Government
  - Type: Gram
  - Body: Panchayat

Languages
  - Official: Telugu
- Time zone: UTC+5:30 (IST)
- PIN: 502286
- Vehicle registration: TS 15
- Lok Sabha constituency: Zaheerabad
- Vidhan Sabha constituency: Narayankhed

Yelgoi is a village located in Telangana state Sangareddy district Manoor mandal. It is located 10 Km range from the Mandal headquarters Manor.

== Statistical Details ==
According to the 2011 Indian Census, the village is spread over 2190 hectares with 338 houses and a population of 1784. The number of males in the village is 931, the number of females is 853. The number of scheduled castes is 246 while the number of scheduled tribes is 73.

== Nearby Villages ==
Pulkurthi, Gudur, Morgi, Davoor

== Education Facilities ==
The Village has a government school for kinder garden to class tenth.
