= Paidra =

Village in Estonia

- Village
- Location in Estonia
- Coordinates: 57°54′59″N 27°10′49″E
- Country: Estonia
- County: Võru County
- Municipality: Võru Parish

Area
  - Total: 5.8 km^{2} (2.2 sq mi)

Population (31.05.2010)
  - Total: 42
  - Density: 7.2/km^{2} (19/sq mi)

Paidra is a village in Võru Parish, Võru County in southeastern Estonia. It is located about 13 km (8 mi) northeast of the town of Võru, along the road from Võru to Räpina (no. 65). The Võhandu River passes through Paidra. There is a lake in the eastern part of the village. Paidra has an area of 5.8 km^{2} and a population of 42 (as of 31 May 2010).

August Sabbe (1909–1978), who is considered the last surviving Estonian Forest Brother, was born and lived in Paidra by the Võhandu River. Later he also lived in a bunker there in Paidra, where he was ambushed and killed at the age of 69.

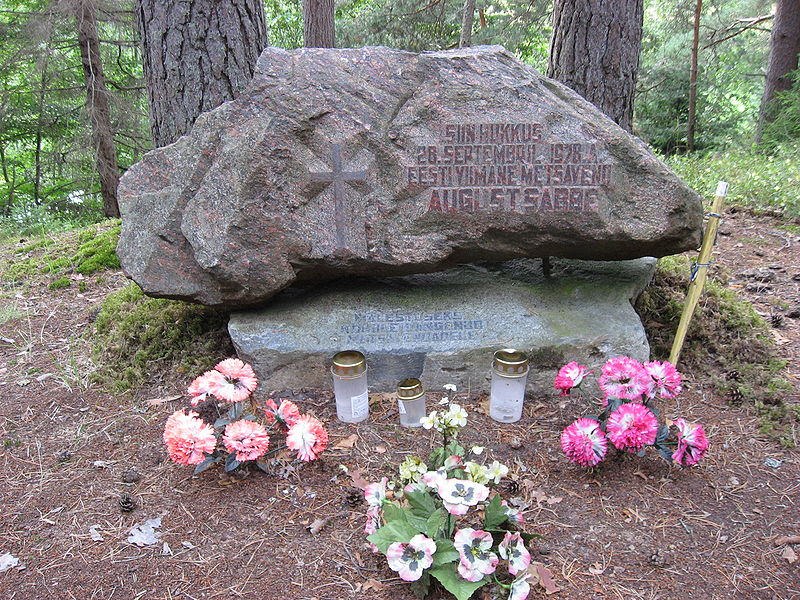
Memorial stone to August Sabbe at his death place
