= Lasva =

Village in Estonia

- Village
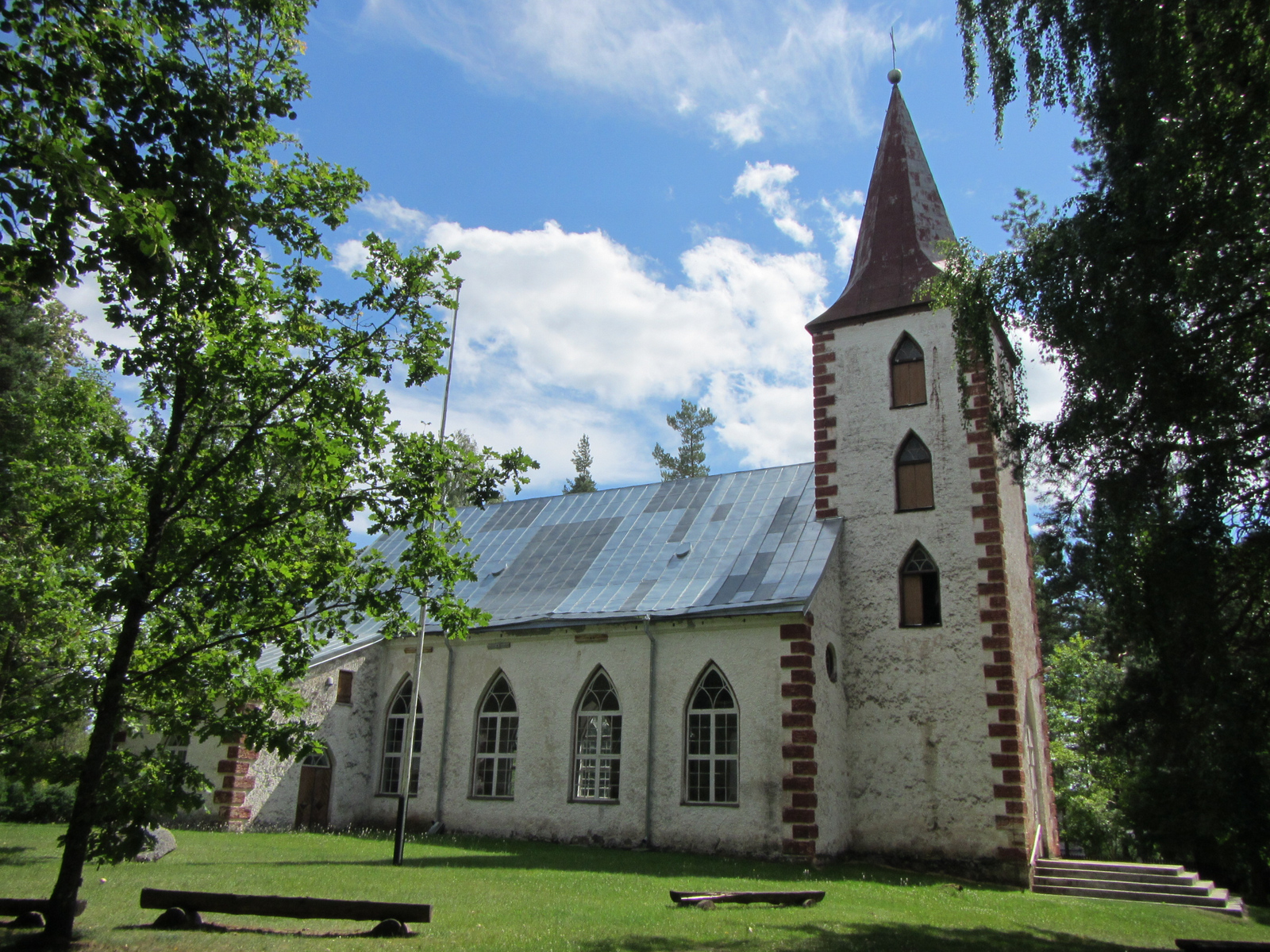
- Lasva Church

- Location in Estonia
- Coordinates: 57°51′35″N 27°10′50″E
- Country: Estonia
- County: Võru County
- Municipality: Võru Parish

Lasva (German: Eichhof) is a village in Võru County in southeastern Estonia. Prior to the 2017 administrative reforms of Estonian municipalities, it was the administrative centre of Lasva Parish. The village is now part of Võru Parish
