= Tsiatsungõlmaa training area =

Military training area in Estonia

Tsiatsungõlmaa harjutusväli Tsiatsungõlmaa training area
- Near Võru in Estonia

Site information
- Type: military training area
- Operator: Estonian Defence Forces
- Status: active

Location
- Coordinates: 57°48′39″N 26°57′02″E
- Area: 31.8 ha (79 acres)

Site history
- In use: 2008

Tsiatsungõlmaa training area is one of the six military training fields used by the Estonian Defence Forces. It is located in Juba village, Võru Parish, Võru County in southeastern Estonia, and covers 32 ha (79 acres). The Tsiatsungõlmaa training area is part of the Nursipalu training area.

== Establishment ==
Tsiatsungõlmaa training area was established on 14 February 2008, with the Government Order No. 79 "Establishment of the Defense Forces Tsiatsungõlmaa training area and handing over the state property."

== See also ==
- Keskpolügoon
