= Lehemetsa =

Village in Estonia

Lehemetsa Lehemõtsa (in Võro)
- Village
- Location in Estonia
- Coordinates: 57°50′24″N 27°06′14″E
- Country: Estonia
- County: Võru County
- Municipality: Võru Parish

Area
  - Total: 5.8 km^{2} (2.2 sq mi)

Population (2011)
  - Total: 27
  - Density: 4.7/km^{2} (12/sq mi)

Lehemetsa (Võro: Lehemõtsa) is a village in Võru Parish, Võru County in southeastern Estonia. It has a population of 27 and an area of 5.8 km^{2}.

Lehemetsa has a station on currently inactive Valga–Pechory railway.
