= Laine Villenthal =

Estonian clergyman

Laine-Reseda Villenthal (29 June 1922 Ellamaa, Lääne County – 23 May 2009) was an Estonian cleric. She was the first ordinated (1967) women cleric in Estonia.

In 1951 she started studying Institute of Theology of the Estonian Evangelical Lutheran Church. and 1964 received the graduation diploma

In 1964 she started her career at Pindi Congregation. On 16 November 1967 she was ordinated as the pastor of Pindi Congregation, being the first ordinated women cleric in Estonia. She served in this congregation for about 40 years. 1984-2003 she was also the pastor at Pechory Congregation.

Awards:

- 2004: Order of the Estonian Red Cross, II class.
