= Sooküla, Pärnu County =

Village in Estonia

Coordinates: 58°07′40″N 24°33′58″E

Sooküla
- Village
- Interactive map of Sooküla
- Country: Estonia
- County: Pärnu County
- Parish: Häädemeeste Parish
- Time zone: UTC+2 (EET)
  - Summer (DST): UTC+3 (EEST)

Sooküla is a village in Häädemeeste Parish, Pärnu County in southwestern Estonia.
