= Otsa =

Village in Estonia

- village
- Location in Estonia
- Coordinates: 57°50′48″N 27°15′05″E
- Country: Estonia
- County: Võru County
- Municipality: Võru Parish

Area
  - Total: 8.8 km^{2} (3.4 sq mi)

Population (2011)
  - Total: 137
  - Density: 16/km^{2} (40/sq mi)

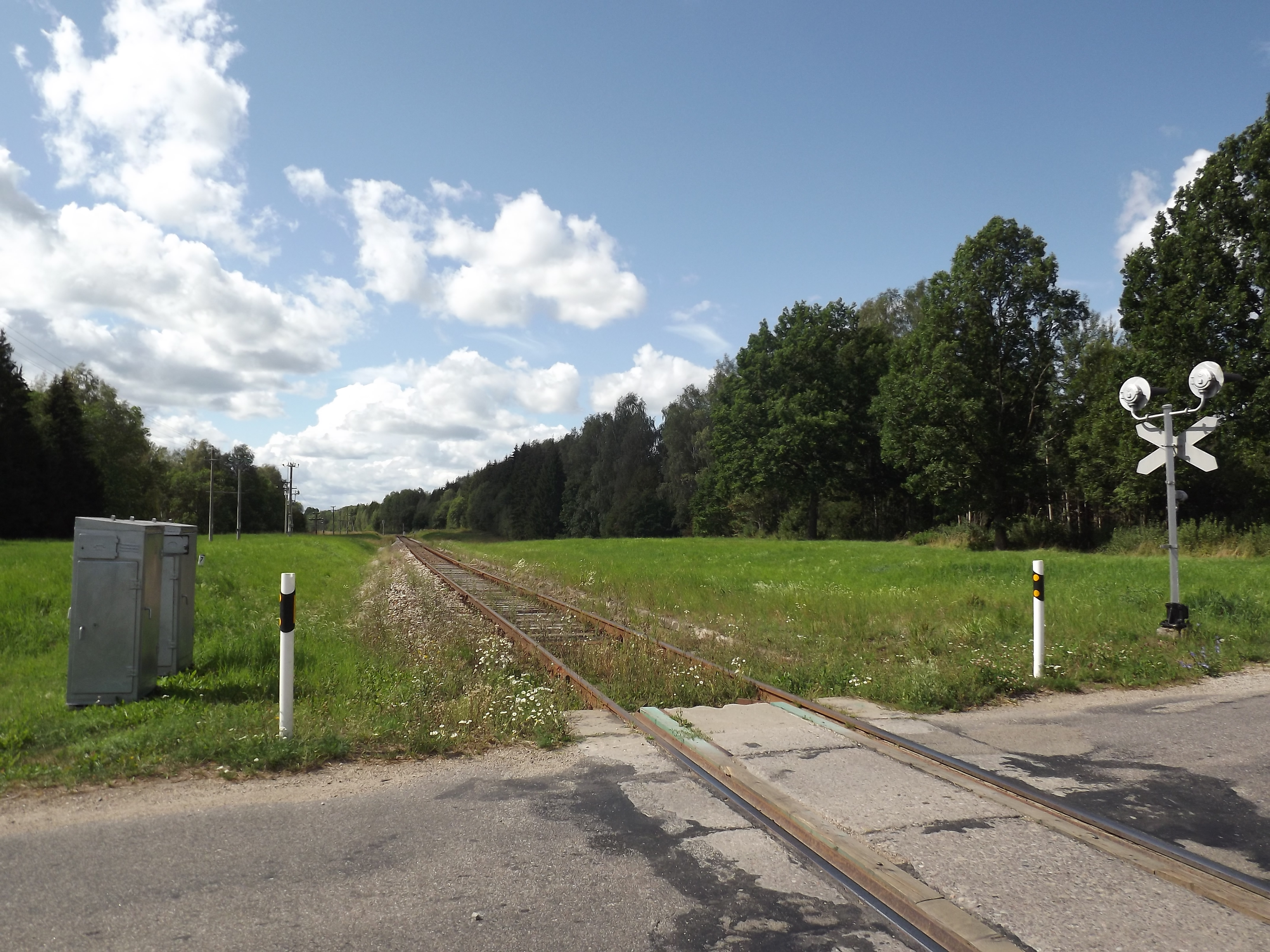
The former Otsa railway stop in 2014. Remains of the platform on the right.

Otsa is a village in Võru Parish, Võru County, in southeastern Estonia. It has a population of 137 (as of 2011) and an area of 8.8 km².

Otsa has a station on currently inactive Valga–Pechory railway.
