= Kääpa, Võru County =

Village in Estonia

- Village
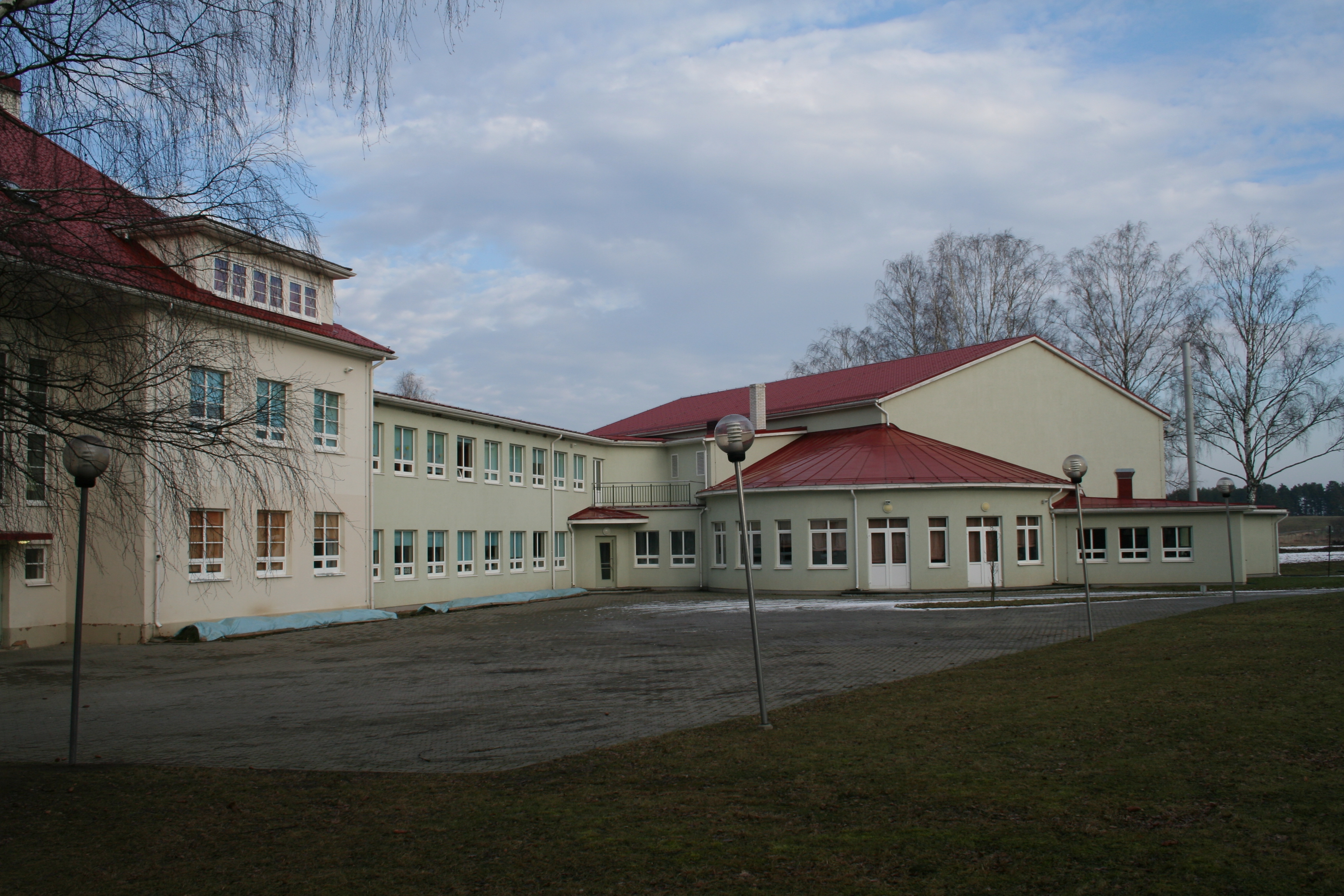
- Kääpa primary school

- Location within Estonia
- Coordinates: 57.868055555556°N 27.115277777778°E
- Country: Estonia
- County: Võru County
- Parish: Võru Parish
- Time zone: UTC+2 (EET)
  - Summer (DST): UTC+3 (EEST)

Kääpa is a village in Võru Parish, Võru County in Estonia.
