= Burman Lauga =

Australian politician

Burman Lauga was an Australian politician.

He was Controller of Customs, and married Eleanor Judith. From 1831 to 1834 he served in the New South Wales Legislative Council. In February 1835 Lagua was given leave to return to Europe, and on 23 February 1835 Lauga, his wife and servant sailed for London on the Roslin Castle.
