= Saaremaa, Võru County =

Village in Estonia

Saaremaa
- Village
- Location in Estonia
- Coordinates: 57°48′03″N 27°08′29″E
- Country: Estonia
- County: Võru County
- Municipality: Võru Parish

Area
  - Total: 1.4 km^{2} (0.54 sq mi)

Population
  - Total: 5
  - Density: 3.6/km^{2} (9.2/sq mi)

Saaremaa is a village in Võru Parish, Võru County in southeastern Estonia. It has a population of 5 and an area of 1.4 km^{2}.
