= Manoor mandal =

Manoor
- Mandal
- Country: India
- State: Telangana
- District: Sangareddy district

Languages
  - Official: Telugu
- Time zone: UTC+5:30 (IST)
- PIN: 502286
- Vehicle registration: TS 15
- Lok Sabha constituency: Zaheerabad
- Vidhan Sabha constituency: Narayankhed

Manoor is a Mandal in Sangareddy district of Telangana, India.

The villages in Manoor mandal include: Athimail, Audathpur, Badalgaon, Bellapur, Borancha, Damargidda, Danvar, Davvur, Dudhagonda, Eanakpally, Erakpalle, Gondegam, Gudur, Karsgutti Kharamungi, Maikode, Manoor, Morgi, Mavinelly, Nadi Gadda, Hukrana Nagalagidda, Pulkurthy, Raipalle, Shari Damargidda, Shelgera, Thimmapur, Thornal, Tumnur, Valloor, Yelgoi, Yesgi etc..

This the most backward mandal in the district. The road connectivity within the mandal and with other parts of the district is very poor. Poor literacy levels are recorded as per the census 2011 and 2014. It comes under Narayankhed Revenue Division.
