= Vokey =

Vokey is a surname. Notable people with the surname include:

- Bob Vokey, golf club manufacturer, best known as a brand of wedge's manufactured by Acushnet Company
- Colby Vokey (born 1965), American lawyer and officer in the United States Marine Corps
- Scott Vokey, Ontario politician

== See also ==
- Voki
