= Barinque =

- Commune
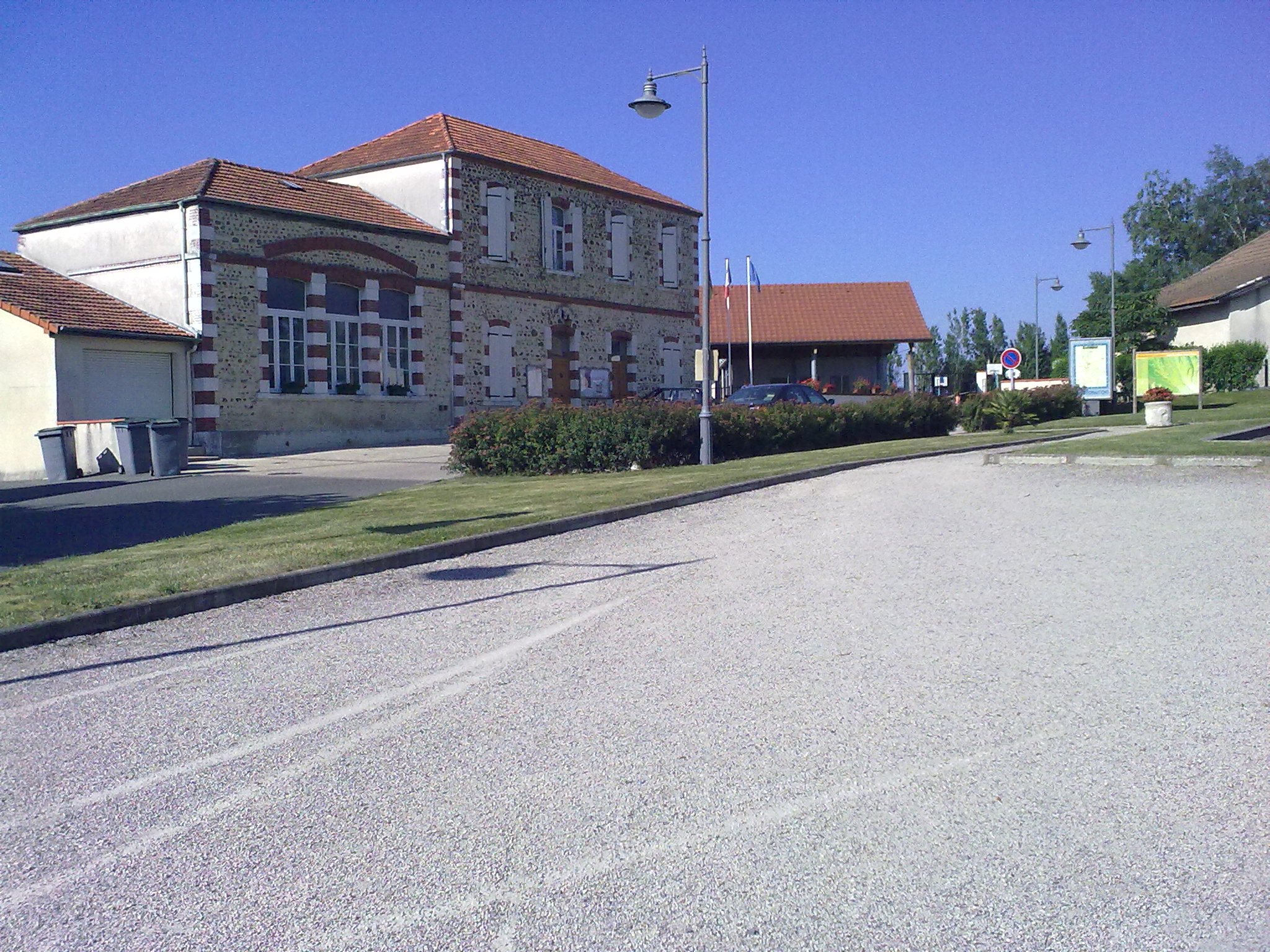
- The Town hall and School
- Location of Barinque
- Location within France Location within Nouvelle-Aquitaine
- Coordinates: 43°24′28″N 0°16′15″W
- Country: France
- Region: Nouvelle-Aquitaine
- Department: Pyrénées-Atlantiques
- Arrondissement: Pau
- Canton: Pays de Morlaàs et du Montanérès

Government
  - Mayor (2020–2026): Sylvie Larrochelle
- Area^{1}: 9.00 km^{2} (3.47 sq mi)
- Elevation: 270 m (890 ft)
- Highest elevation: 284 m (932 ft)
- Lowest elevation: 194 m (636 ft)
- Population (2023): 580
  - Density: 64/km^{2} (170/sq mi)
- Time zone: UTC+01:00 (CET)
  - Summer (DST): UTC+02:00 (CEST)
- INSEE/Postal code: 64095 /64160
- ^{1} French Land Register data, which excludes lakes, ponds, glaciers > 1 km^{2} (0.386 sq mi or 247 acres) and river estuaries.

Barinque (French pronunciation: [baʁɛ̃k]; Occitan: Barinco) is a commune of the Pyrénées-Atlantiques department in the Nouvelle-Aquitaine region of south-western France.

== Geography ==
Barinque is located on a steep hill overlooking the Souye valley, some 15 kilometres north-east of Pau and 7 km south-east of Auriac in the Vic-Bihl region. Access to the commune is by the D222 road from Higuères-Souye in the south which goes north through the west of the commune to the village then continues east to join the D43 which forms the south-eastern border of the commune as it goes from Escoubès in the east to Saint-Jammes in the south. There are large areas of forest in the south of the commune and scattered forests in the commune however most of the commune is farmland.

The Luy de France flows from the south forming the entire western border of the commune before continuing north to eventually join the Luy north of Castel-Sarrazin. The Souye river flows from south to north-west through the heart of the commune joining the Luy de France on the western border of the commune. The Ruisseau de Cimpceu rises east of the village and flows north to join the Gabas west of Sévignacq.

=== Places and Hamlets ===
Below is a list of places and hamlets in the commune:

- Antoni
- Arnaud
- Artigou
- Auguste
- Barbe
- Barthe
- Bié
- Bourdallé
- Castagnet
- Champrilh
- Charron
- Coulate
- Daguet
- Fisse
- La Gare
- Garimbay
- Gélizé
- Grabette
- Jeanbounat
- Labat
- Laragnou
- Lardas
- Lasalle
- Lauga
- Lavigne (2 places)
- Loudet
- Loustau
- Margotou
- Mariette
- Marque
- Mingenette
- Monge
- Mouchou
- Parjouan
- Pébrocq
- Picou
- Pierrot
- Piot
- Piquet
- Pisseu
- Portaix
- Prétou
- Prince
- Pucheu
- Saubade
- Soubirou
- Toulardet

== Toponymy ==
The commune name in béarnais is Barinco (pronounced Barincou). Michel Grosclaude concluded that the name is of Occitan origin with the meaning "slope towards a ravine", following Dauzat and Rostaing who offered a Gaulish and pre-Gaulish root barr- meaning "height" or "summit" with the suffix -incum.

The following table details the origins of the commune name and other names in the commune.

Name	Spelling	Date	Source	Page	Origin	Description
Barinque	Barinco	1385	Grosclaude			Village
	Barinco	1402	Raymond	21	Census	
	Barincquo	1538	Raymond	21	Reformation	
	Barinquo	1542	Raymond	21	Barinque	
	Barincou	1676	Raymond	21	Reformation	
	Barrinque	1801	Raymond	21	Bulletin des lois	
Sansous	Sansous	1385	Raymond	156	Census	Farm

Sources:

- Grosclaude: Toponymic Dictionary of communes, Béarn, 2006 (in French)
- Raymond: Topographic Dictionary of the Department of Basses-Pyrenees, 1863, on the page numbers indicated in the table. (in French)
- EHESS: Des villages de Cassini aux communes d'aujourd'hui: Commune data sheet Barinque, EHESS (in French).

Origins:

- Census: Census of Béarn
- Reformation: Reformation of Béarn
- Barinque: Titles of Barinque

== History ==
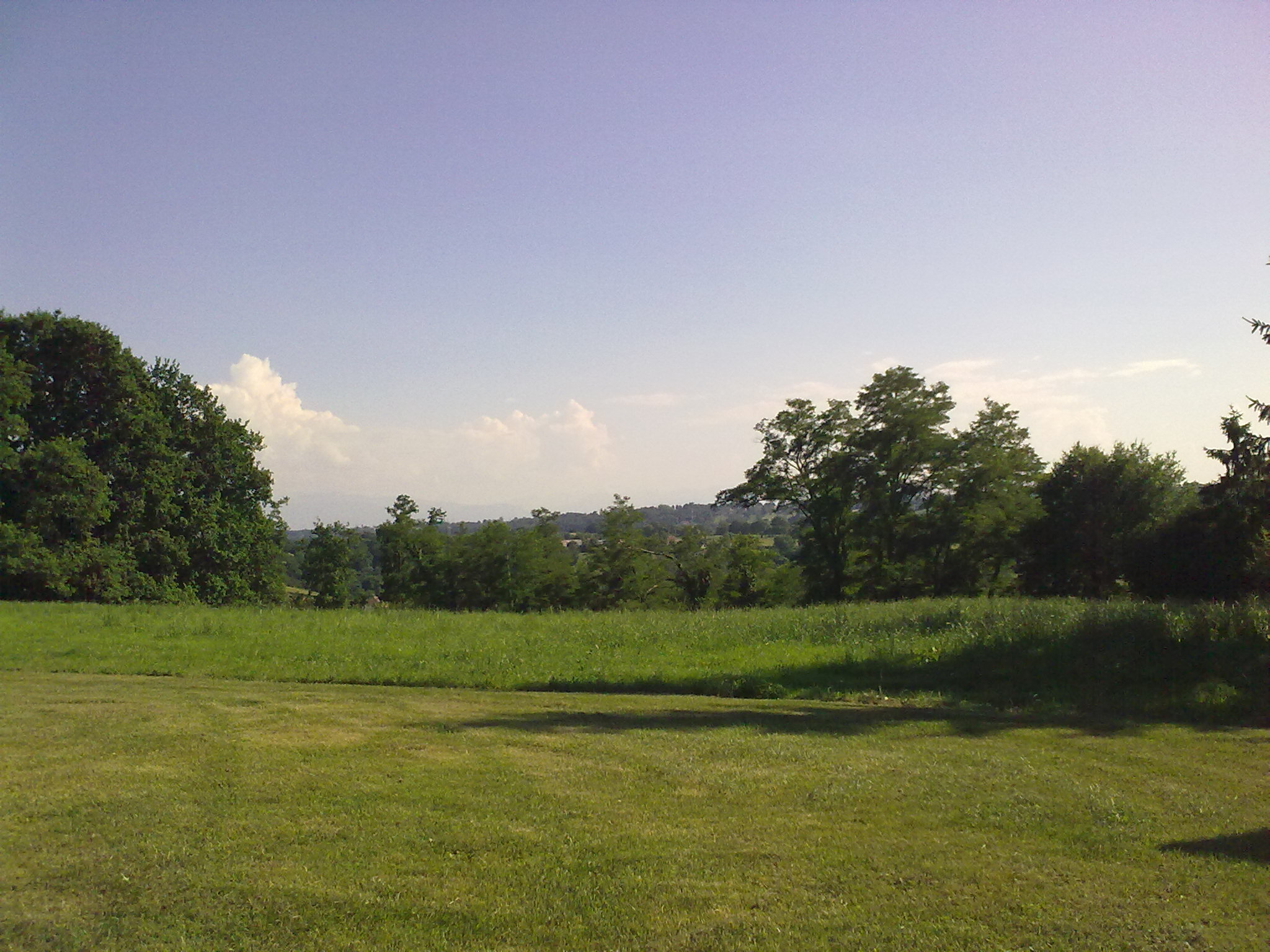
Countryside in Barinque

Paul Raymond noted on page 21 of his 1863 dictionary that Barinque had a Lay Abbey, vassal of the Viscounts of Béarn. In 1385 Barinque had 15 fires and depended on the bailiwick of Pau.

Barinque was part of the Barony of Navailles in the Middle Ages.

The commune was part of the Arch-Deaconry of Vic-Bilh which depended on the Bishop of Lescar and Lembeye was the capital.

Barinque appears as Barinque on the 1750 Cassini Map but as Barringue on the 1790 version.

== Administration ==
List of Successive Mayors

From	To	Name
1900	1929	Alphonse Castagnet
1929	1931	Bernard Millet
1931	1944	Guillaume Piot
1944	1945	Jean Laborde-Loustau
1945	1947	Guillaume Piot
1947	1977	Jean Laborde-Loustau
1977	2008	José Laborde-Loustau
2008	2020	Bernard Buron
2020	2026	Sylvie Larrochelle

== Demography ==
The inhabitants of the commune are known as Barinquais or Barinquaises in French.

Historical population

Year	Pop.	±% p.a.
1793	525	—
1821	559	+0.22%
1846	653	+0.62%
1872	512	−0.93%
1901	488	−0.17%
1926	346	−1.37%
1946	304	−0.64%
1962	261	−0.95%
1968	257	−0.26%

Year	Pop.	±% p.a.
1975	269	+0.65%
1982	370	+4.66%
1990	470	+3.04%
1999	489	+0.44%
2007	562	+1.75%
2012	605	+1.49%
2017	606	+0.03%
2023	580	−0.73%

Source: EHESS and INSEE

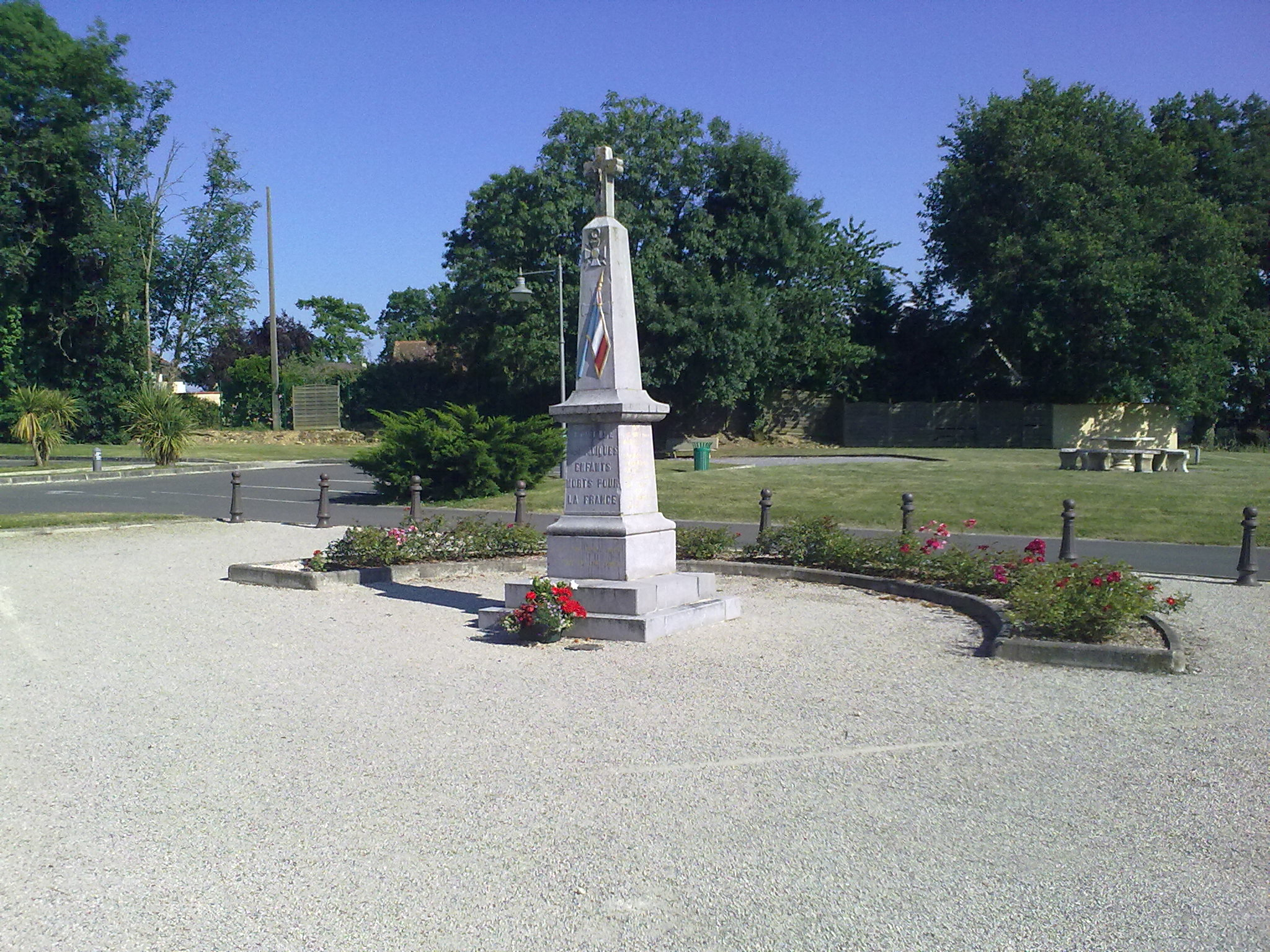
The War Memorial

== Culture and heritage ==
=== Civil heritage ===
The commune has a number of buildings and sites that are registered as historical monuments:

- A Farmhouse at Saubade (1733)
- A Farmhouse at Pierrot (1765)
- A Farmhouse at Loudet (19th century)
- Houses and Farms (18th-19th century)

=== Religious heritage ===
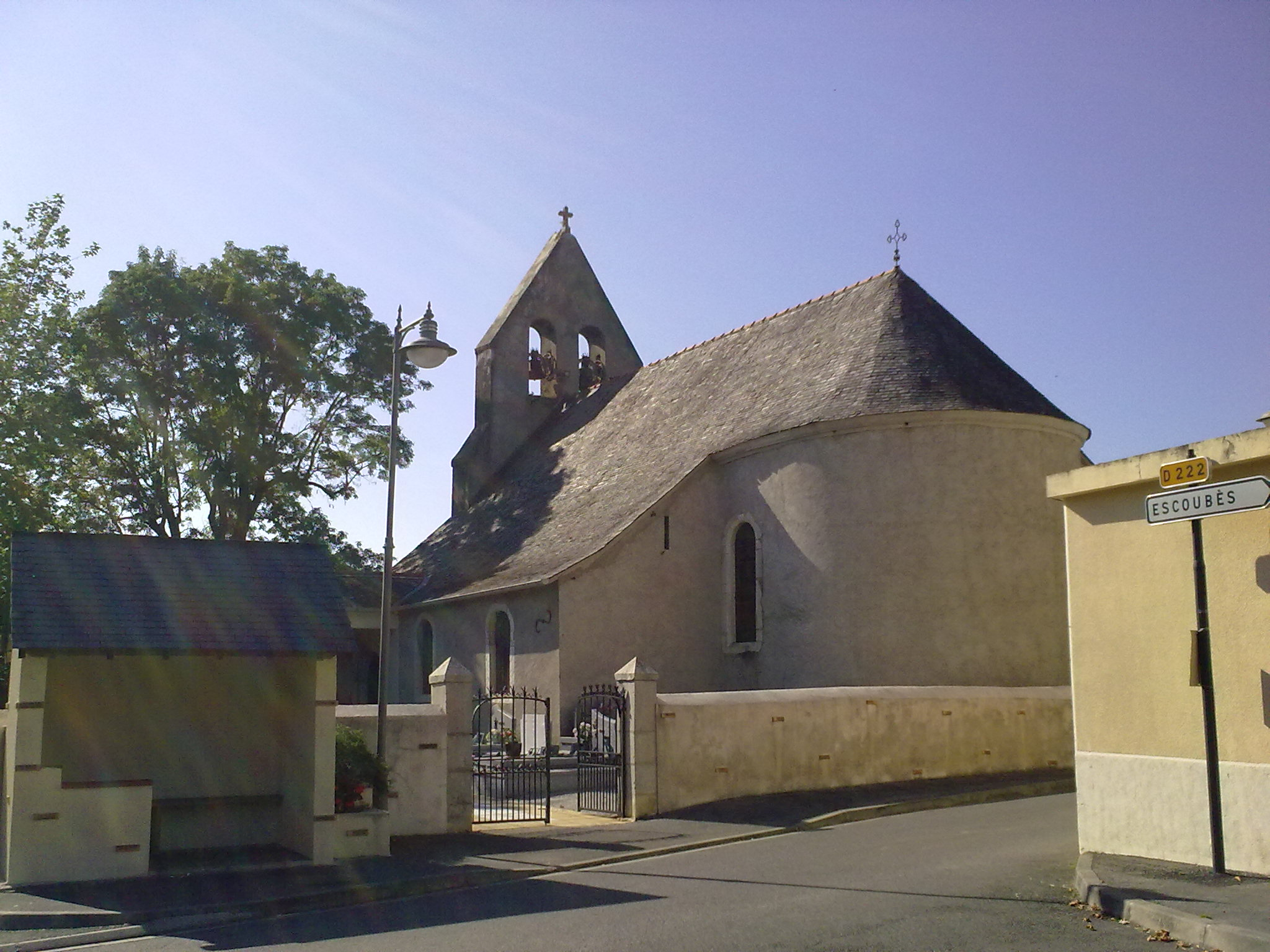
The Parish Church of Saint-Barthélémy

The Parish Church of Saint-Barthélémy (12th century) is registered as an historical monument. The Church contains many items that are registered as historical objects:

- The Furniture in the Church
- A container for Baptismal water (17th century)
- A Collection Plate (19th century)
- 6 Candlesticks (19th century)
- A Chalice (18th century)
- 2 Processional Banners (19th century)
- A Mural Painting: Saints Paul and Peter and 2 Angels (16th century)
- A Stoup (19th century)
- A secondary Altar of the Virgin with Tabernacle and stand for a Monstrance (18th century)
- An Altar Painting: the Martyrdom of Saint Barthélémy (1650)
- A Retable (1650)
- 3 Statuettes: Saint Peter, Saint Paul, and the Virgin with child (1720)
- A Tabernacle (1650)
- The main Altar and Tomb (18th century)
- The main Altar, Tabernacle, and Retable (18th century)
- A Stained glass window: Saint John (Bay 2) (1873)
- 4 Stained glass windows (Bays 3-6) (19th century)
- A Capital and recessed Stoup (13th century)

== See also ==
- Communes of the Pyrénées-Atlantiques department
