= Puusepa, Võru County =

Village in Estonia

Coordinates: 57°51′21″N 27°04′01″E

Puusepa
- Village
- Interactive map of Puusepa
- Country: Estonia
- County: Võru County
- Parish: Võru Parish
- Time zone: UTC+2 (EET)
  - Summer (DST): UTC+3 (EEST)

Puusepa is a village in Võru Parish, Võru County in southern Estonia.
