= Noodasküla =

Village in Estonia

- Village
- Location within Estonia
- Coordinates: 57.8136°N 27.1581°E
- Country: Estonia
- County: Võru County
- Parish: Võru Parish
- Time zone: UTC+2 (EET)
  - Summer (DST): UTC+3 (EEST)

Noodasküla is a village in Võru Parish, Võru County in Estonia.
