= Võru Parish =

Municipality of Estonia (2017)

Coordinates: 57°50′33″N 27°0′23″E

Võru Parish Võru vald (in Estonian) Võro vald (in Võro)
- Municipality of Estonia
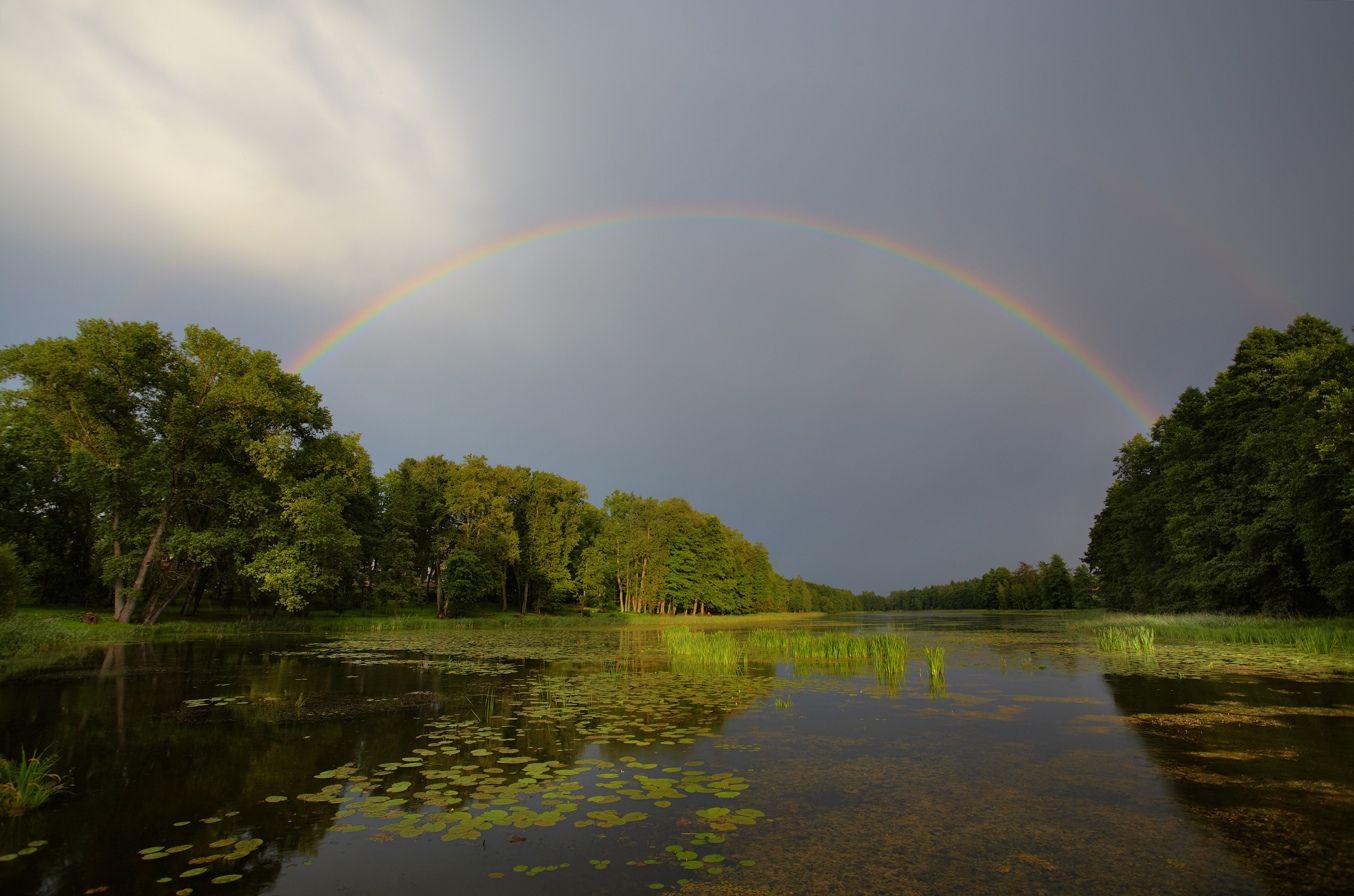
- Väimela Alajärv lake

- Flag Coat of arms

- Võru Parish within Võru County
- Country: Estonia
- County: Võru County
- Administrative centre: Võru

Area
  - Total: 952 km^{2} (368 sq mi)

Population (01.01.2019)
  - Total: 10,738
  - Density: 11.3/km^{2} (29.2/sq mi)
- ISO 3166 code: EE-917
- Website: www.voruvald.ee

Võru Parish (Estonian: Võru vald; Võro: Võro vald) is a rural municipality of Estonia, in Võru County. It has a population of 4,770 (as of 1 January 2009) and an area of 202.23 km^{2}.

== See also ==
- Tsiatsungõlmaa training area

== Religion ==
Religion in Võru Parish (2021)
1. Unaffiliated (74.8%)
2. Lutheran (15.7%)
3. Orthodox (4.00%)
4. Other Christians (3.00%)
5. Other religions (0.80%)
6. Unknown (1.70%)

== Notable people ==
- Gottlieb Ast (1874 in Orava – 1919), politician, Mayor of Tallinn in 1919.
- Eduard Pütsep (1898 in Vastseliina – 1960), freestyle wrestler, gold medallist at the 1924 Summer Olympics
- August Sabbe (1909 in Paidra – 1978), one of the last surviving members of the Forest Brothers
- Väino Puura (born 1951 in Keema), baritone opera and operetta singer
- Enn Kasak (born 1954 in Navi), philosopher and astrophysicist
- Aavo Pikkuus (born 1954 in Kapera), cyclist and team gold medallist for the 100 km team time trial at the 1976 Summer Olympics
- Ivari Padar (born 1965 in Navi), politician, Minister of Finance, 2007/2009
- Teet Helm (born 1959 in Võru Parish), politician, mayor of Räpina and the mayor of Võnnu.
- Marju Kõivupuu (born 1960 in Mäepõru), cultural activist and folklorist.
