= Sõmerpalu Parish =

Former municipality of Estonia

Coordinates: 57°51′2″N 26°49′35″E

Sõmerpalu Parish Sõmerpalu vald (in Estonian) Sõmmõrpalo vald (in Võro)
- Former municipality of Estonia
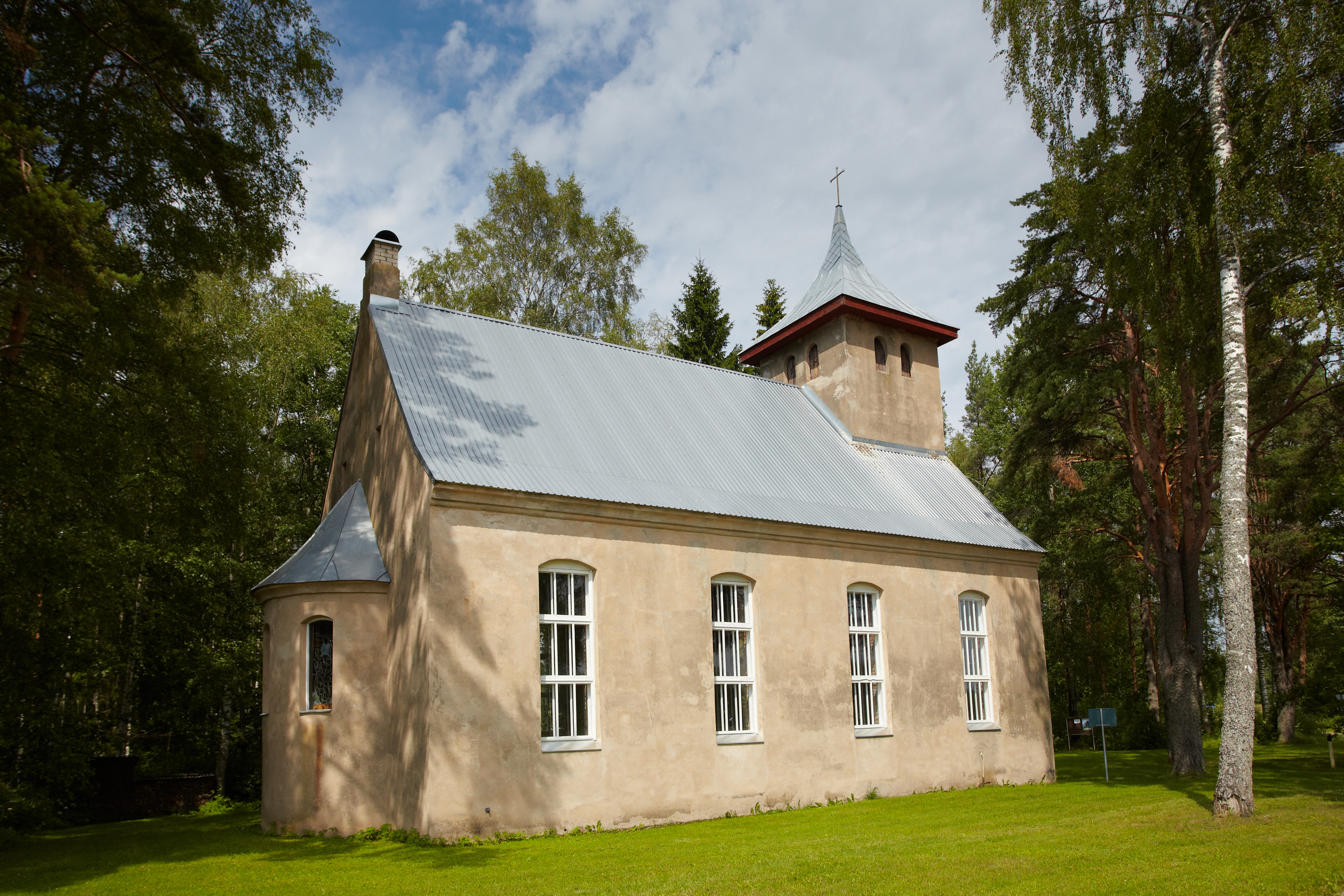
- Heimtali Peetri church

- Flag Coat of arms

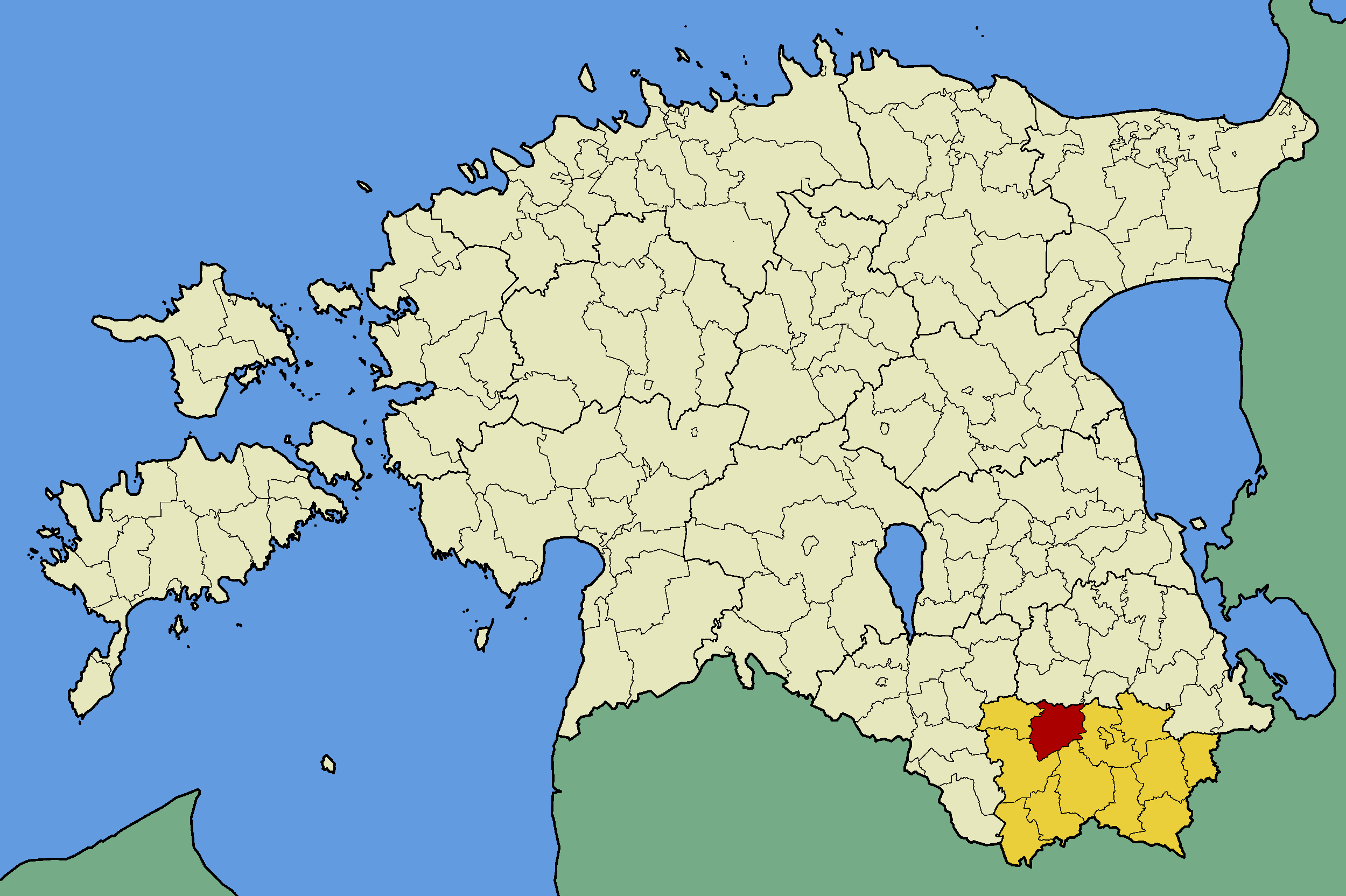
- Sõmerpalu Parish within Võru County.
- Country: Estonia
- County: Võru County
- Administrative centre: Sõmerpalu

Area
  - Total: 181.93 km^{2} (70.24 sq mi)

Population (01.01.2016)
  - Total: 1,771
  - Density: 9.735/km^{2} (25.21/sq mi)
- Website: www.somerpalu.ee

Sõmerpalu Parish (Estonian: Sõmerpalu vald; Võro: Sõmmõrpalo vald) was a rural municipality of Estonia, in Võru County. It had a population of 1,771 (as of 1 January 2016) and an area of 181.93 km².

== Settlements ==
Small borough

Sõmerpalu

Villages

Alakülä - Alapõdra - Haava - Haidaku - Haamaste - Hänike - Hargi - Heeska - Horma - Hutita - Järvere - Kahro - Kärgula - Keema - Kurenurme - Lakovitsa - Leiso - Liiva - Lilli-Anne - Linnamäe - Mäekülä - Majala - Mustassaare - Mustja - Osula - Pritsi - Pulli - Punakülä - Rauskapalu - Rummi - Sõmerpalu - Sulbi - Udsali - Varese

== Images ==
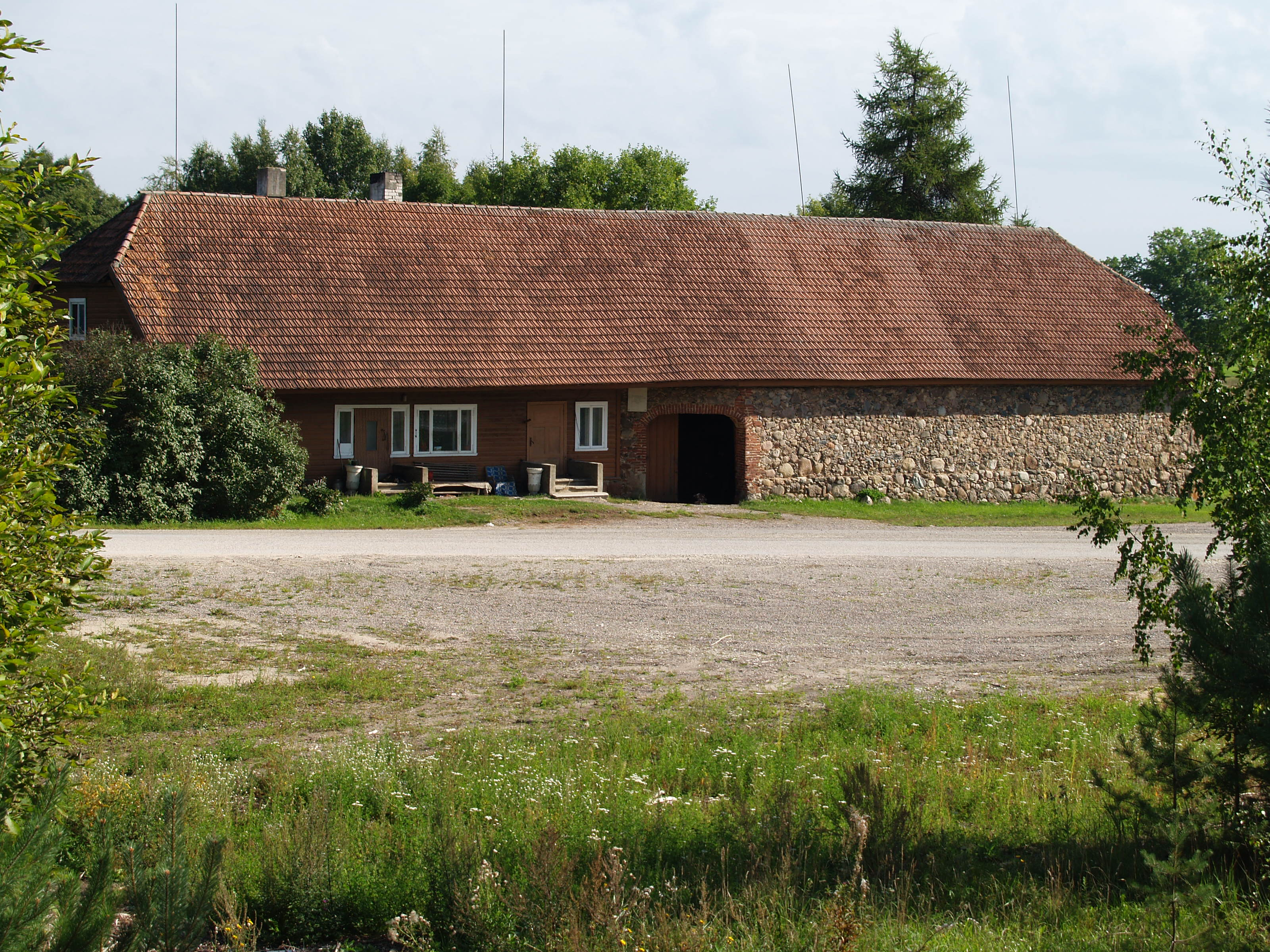

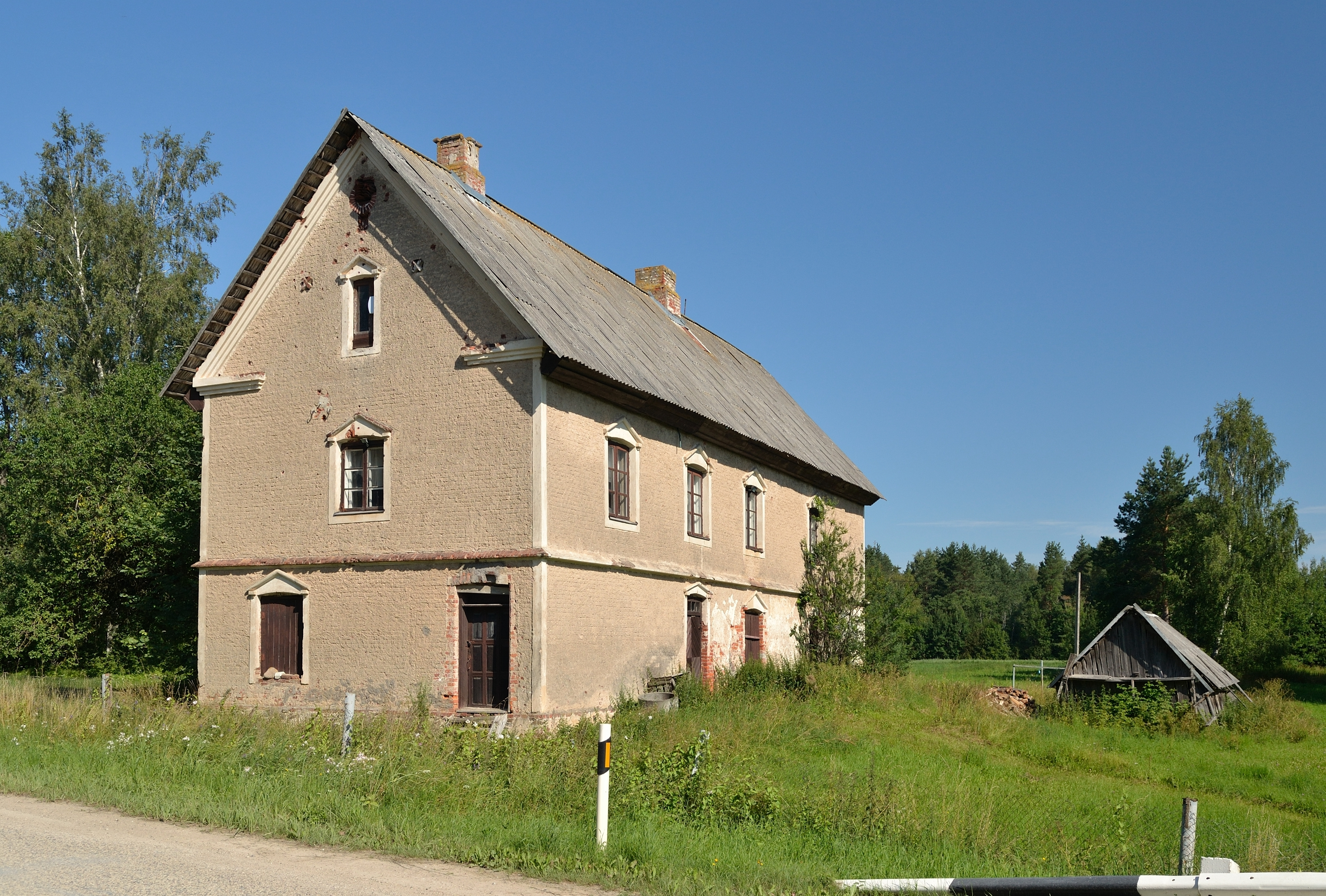

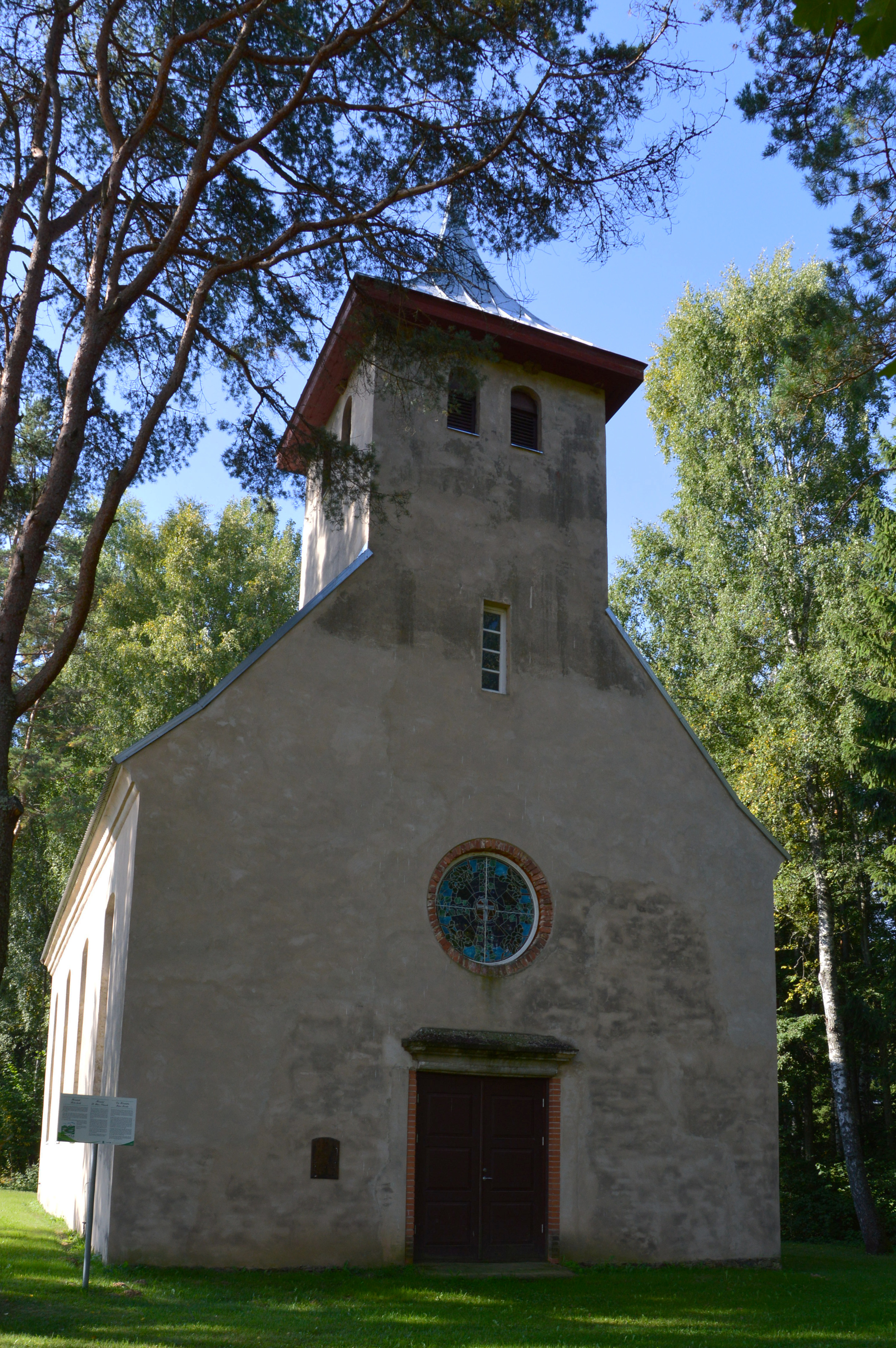

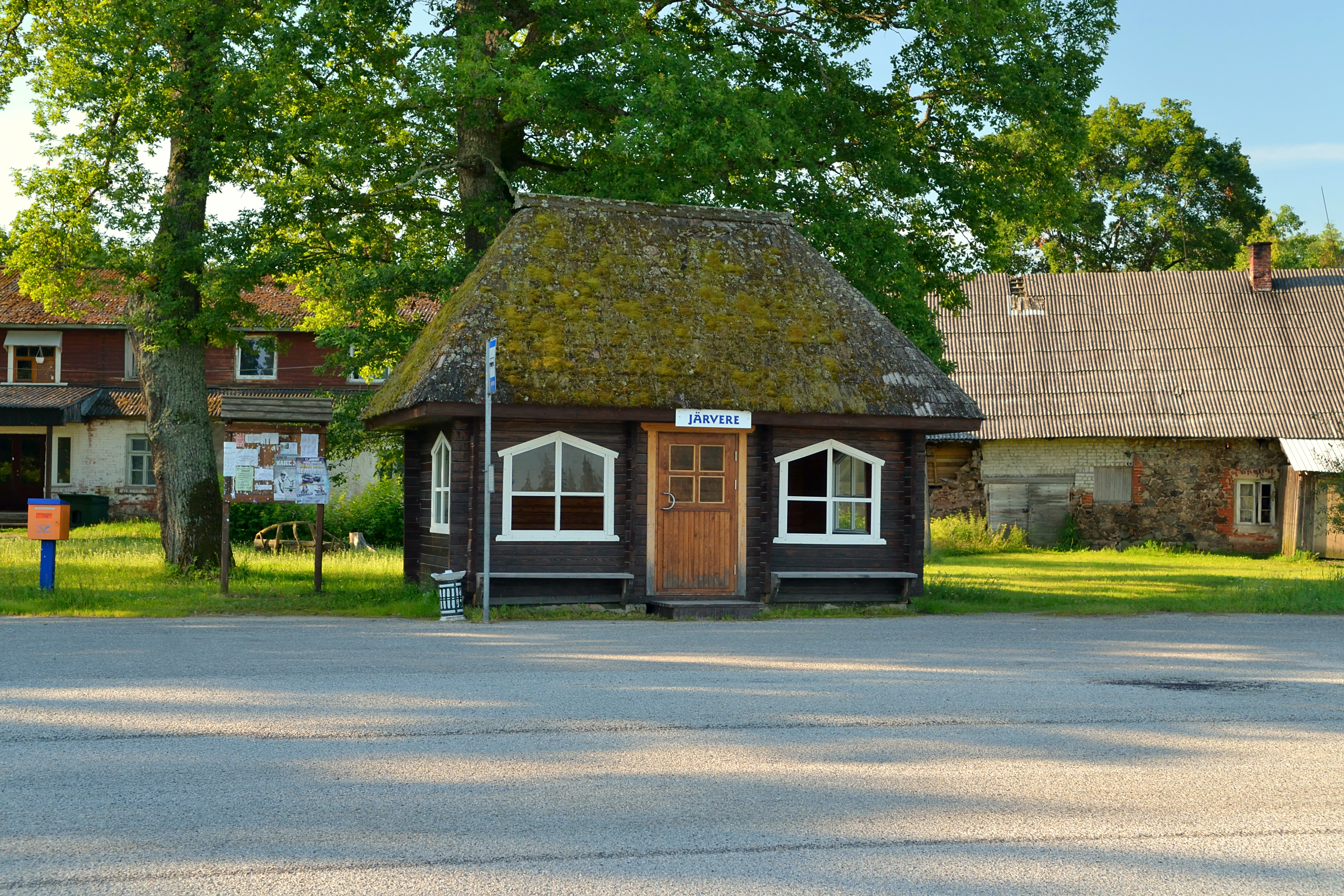

== See also ==
- Nursipalu training area
