= Udsali =

Udsali may refer to several places in Estonia:

- Udsali, Rõuge Parish, village in Võru County, Estonia
- Udsali, Võru Parish, village in Võru County, Estonia
