= Haava =

Haava may refer to:

Geography

- Ha‘ava, channel in Marquesas Islands, French Polynesia
- Haava, Tartu County, village in Tartu Parish, Tartu County
- Haava, Sõmerpalu Parish, village in Sõmerpalu Parish, Võru County
- Haava, former name of Haava-Tsäpsi, village in Vastseliina Parish, Võru County

People

- Anna Haava (1864–1957), Estonian poet
- Henno Haava (born 1973), Estonian runner
