= Linnamäe =

Linnamäe may refer to several places in Estonia:

Places

- Linnamäe, Lääne County, village in Lääne-Nigula Parish, Lääne County
- Linnamäe, Võru County, village in Võru Parish, Võru County

People

- Georg Linnamäe (born 1998), Estonian rally driver
