= Varese (disambiguation) =

Varese is the capital of the Italian province of Varese. It may also refer to:

- Edgard Varèse (1883–1965), a French-born composer
- Louise Varèse (1890–1989), the composer's wife
- Varese, Estonia, a village in Sõmerpalu Parish
- Varèse Sarabande, an American record label, distributed by Universal Music Group
- Varese Calcio (formerly A.S. Varese 1910), an Italian football club
- Playa Varese, in the city of Mar del Plata, Argentina
- Province of Varese, a province in the Lombardy region of Italy
