= Pulli =

Pulli may refer to several places in Estonia:

- Pulli, Pärnu County, village in Sauga Parish, Pärnu County
  - Pulli settlement, oldest known human settlement in Estonia
- Pulli, Saare County, village in Orissaare Parish, Saare County
- Pulli, Tartu County, village in Kambja Parish, Tartu County
- Pulli, earlier name of Põdramõtsa, village in Rõuge Parish, Võru County
- Pulli, Rõuge Parish, village in Rõuge Parish, Võru County
- Pulli, Võru Parish, village in Võru Parish, Võru County

== Other uses ==
- pulli, The plural of pullus, a young bird
- Puḷḷi is the name of the virama in Tamil script.
