= Sulbi =

Sulbi may refer to several places in Estonia:

- Sulbi, Setomaa Parish, village in Võru County, Estonia
- Sulbi, Võru Parish, village in Võru County, Estonia
