= Majala =

Majala may refer to several places in Estonia:

- Majala, Tartu County, village in Elva Parish, Tartu County
- Majala, Võru County, village in Võru Parish, Võru County
