= Udsali, Rõuge Parish =

Village in Estonia

- Village
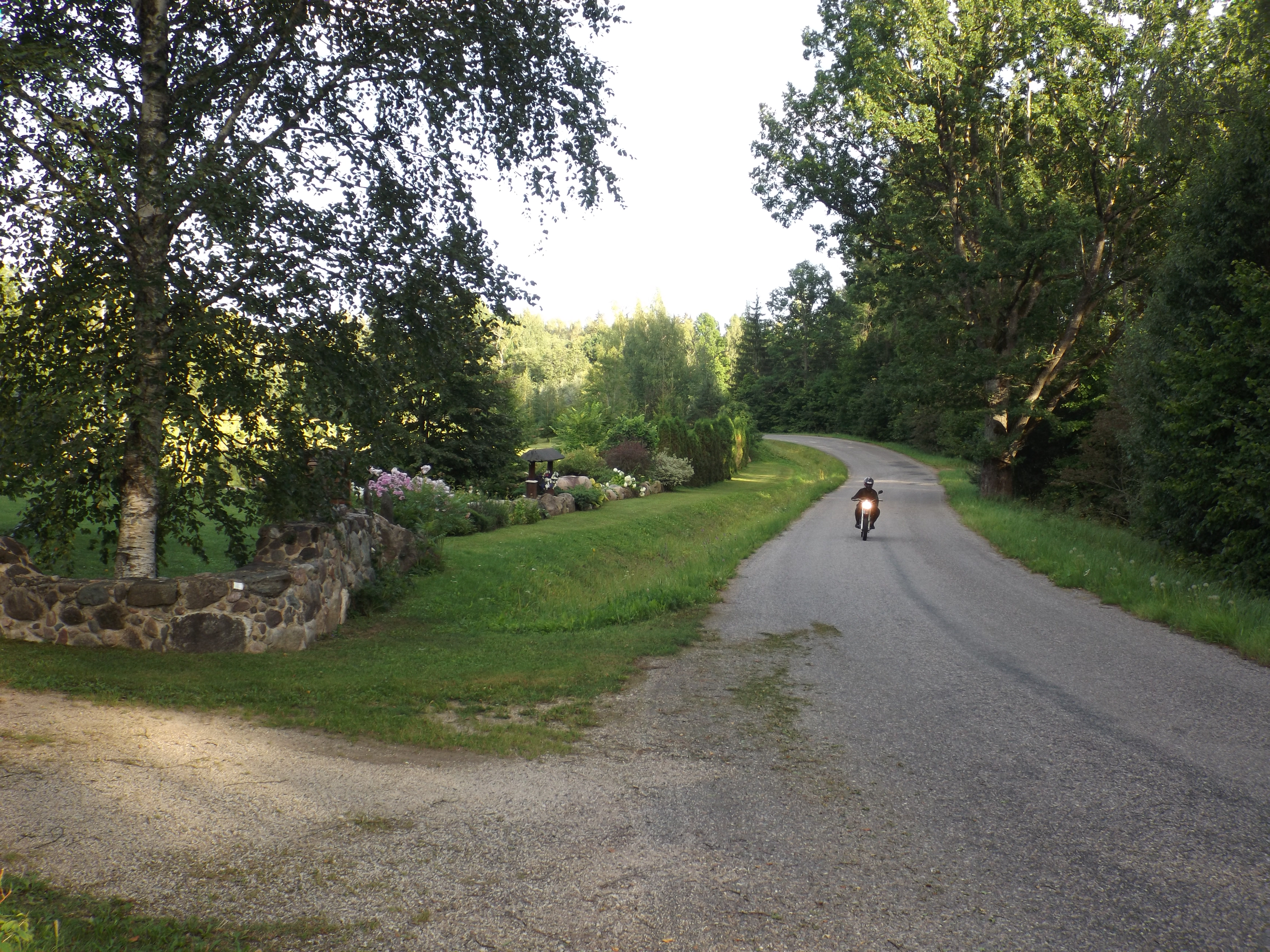
- Rõuge-Kurgjärve-Haanja road on the border of Udsali and Vadsa villages

- Location within Estonia
- Coordinates: 57.731111111111°N 27.005°E
- Country: Estonia
- County: Võru County
- Parish: Rõuge Parish
- Time zone: UTC+2 (EET)
  - Summer (DST): UTC+3 (EEST)

Udsali is a village in Rõuge Parish, Võru County in Estonia.
