= Mustassaare =

Village in Estonia

- village
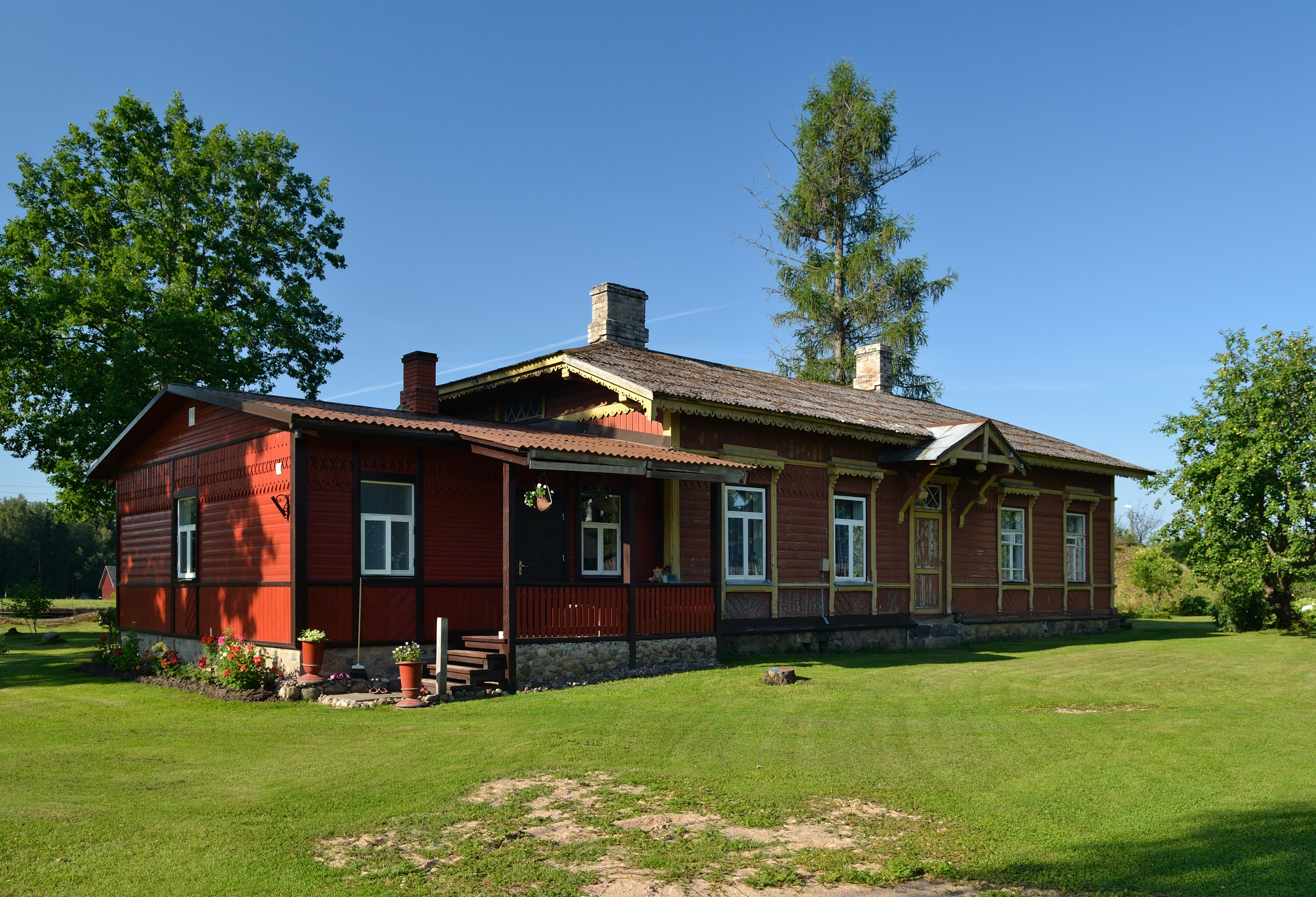
- Sõmerpalu station former main building, today a house

- Location in Estonia
- Coordinates: 57°50′15″N 26°48′11″E
- Country: Estonia
- County: Võru County
- Municipality: Võru Parish

Population (01.01.2008)
  - Total: 31

Mustassaare is a village in Võru Parish, Võru County, in southeastern Estonia. It is located just southwest of Sõmerpalu, the administrative centre of the municipality. Mustassaare has a population of 31 (as of 1 January 2008).

Mustassaare has a station on currently inactive Valga–Pechory railway.

The southeastern part of Mustassaare village territory is occupied by Nursipalu training area used by the Estonian Defence Forces.
