= Väino Puura =

Estonian opera and operetta singer (born 1951)

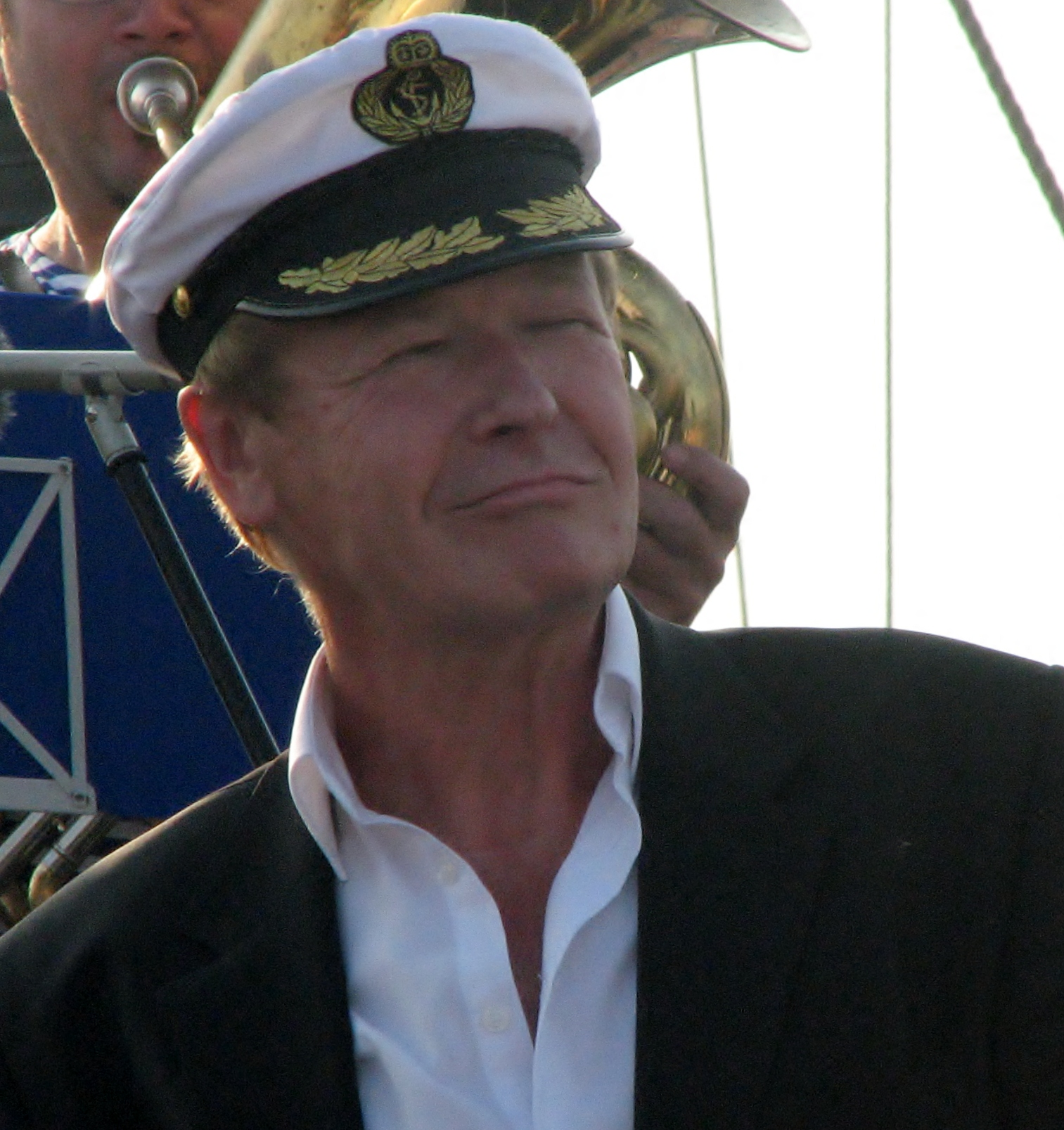
- Väino Puura in 2012
- Born: 30 January 1951 (age 75); Keema, then part of Estonian SSR, Soviet Union
- Education: Tallinn Conservatoire
- Occupations: opera singer; operetta singer
- Years active: 1978 - 2011
- Spouse: Sirje Puura (m. 1974)
- Children: Rene Puura, Annika Puura

Väino Puura (born 30 January 1951) is an Estonian opera and operetta singer (baritone).

In 1978, he graduated from Tallinn State Conservatory. From 1976 to 2011, he was soloist for Estonian National Opera. Besides opera roles, he has also participated in several music films (e.g. "Siin me oleme"), television series (e.g. "Kelgukoerad")

== Early life and education ==
Puura was born in Keema, Võru County, Estonia on 30 January 1951. His father Valter and mother Alli were loggers.

== Career ==
During his time at the Tallinn Conservatoire, he sang as part of the Vanemuine Theatre's choir from 1971 to 1973. In 1971, he performed in his first opera role in Luigi Cherubini's Medea.

== Roles ==
- envoy (Cherubini's "Medeia", 1971 in Vanemuine)
- friend (Oit's "Kes usub muinasjutte", 1972 in Vanemuine)
- Figaro and Almaviva (Mozart "Figaro pulm", 1976 in Tallinna State Conservatory, 1996 in Theatre Estonia)

== Personal life ==
When Puura was a still a student at the Tallinn Conservatoire, he met and married Sirje. The two married in 1974.
