= Nursipalu training area =

Military training area in Estonia

Nursipalu harjutusväli Nursipalu training area
- Near Võru in Estonia

Site information
- Type: Military training area
- Operator: Estonian Defence Forces
- Status: Active

Location
- Coordinates: 57°49′N 26°51′E
- Area: 3,300 ha (8,200 acres)

Site history
- In use: 2008

Nursipalu training area is one of the six military training fields used by the Estonian Defence Forces. It is located in Võru and Rõuge municipalities in Võru County. It occupies most of Tsirgupalu village territory, southern part of Hänike village and southeastern part of Mustassaare village. The area of the training area is approximately 3,300 ha (8,200 acres).

== History ==
During the Soviet occupation of Estonia, Nursipalu training area was part of the Soviet Army Visnevski military-campus and training area for Soviet Airborne Troops and missile brigade with the area of 3,703 ha.

=== Establishment ===
Nursipalu training area was established on 14 February 2008, with the Government Order No. 79 "Establishment of the Defense Forces Nursipalu training area and handing over the state property."

== See also ==
- Keskpolügoon
