= Haava-Tsäpsi =

Village in Estonia

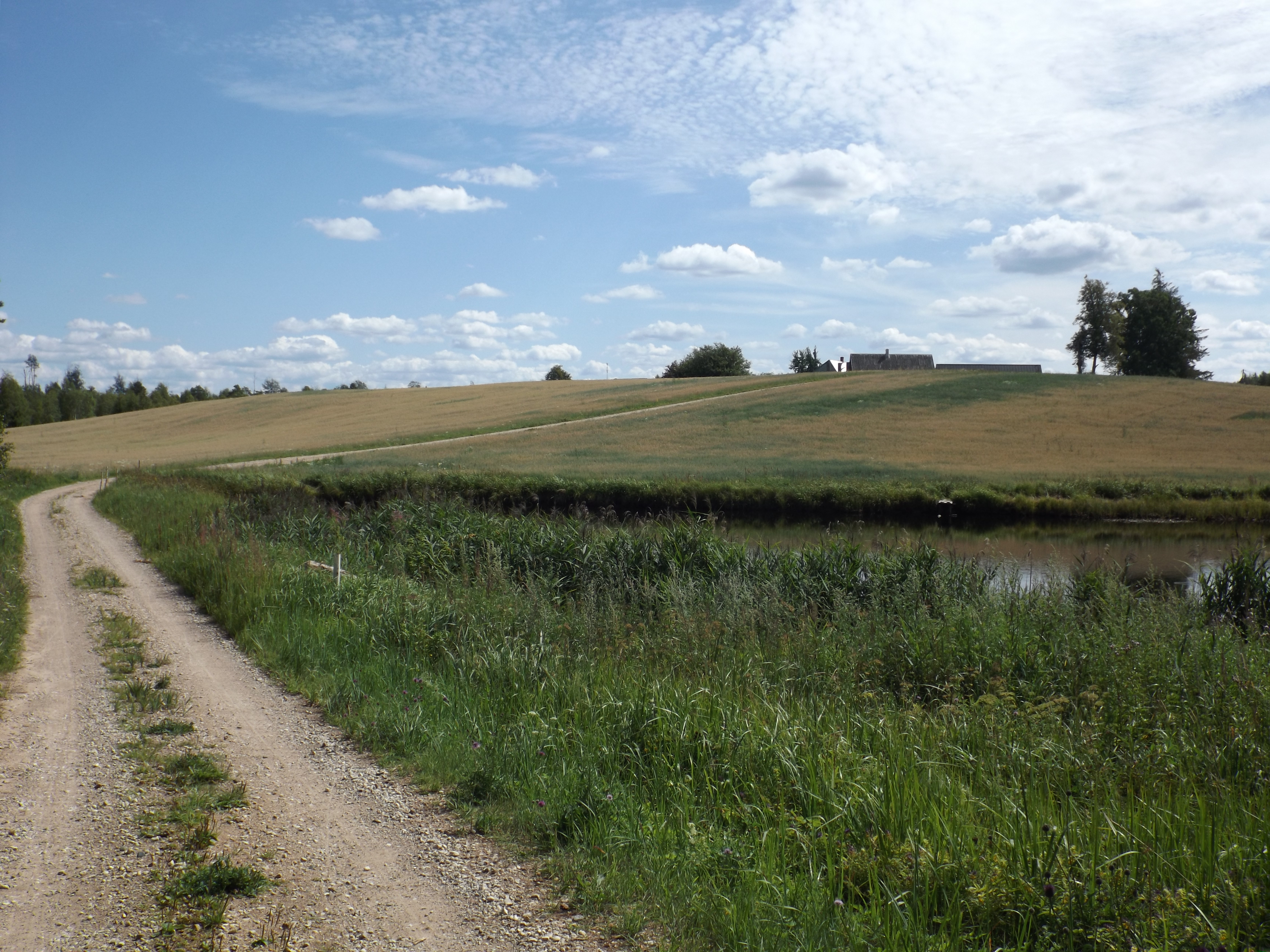
- Haava-Tsäpsi village

- Location within Estonia
- Coordinates: 57°41′58″N 27°13′24″E
- Country: Estonia
- County: Võru County
- Municipality: Võru Parish

Population
  - Total: 16

Haava-Tsäpsi is a village in Võru Parish, Võru County, Estonia.
