= Sõmerpalu (village) =

Village in Estonia

- Village
- Location within Estonia
- Coordinates: 57.8625°N 26.813888888889°E
- Country: Estonia
- County: Võru County
- Parish: Võru Parish
- Time zone: UTC+2 (EET)
  - Summer (DST): UTC+3 (EEST)

Sõmerpalu (German: Sommerpahlen) is a village in Võru Parish, Võru County in Estonia.
