= Majala, Võru County =

Village in Estonia

Majala
- Village
- Location within Estonia
- Coordinates: 57.868055555556°N 26.680555555556°E
- Country: Estonia
- County: Võru County
- Parish: Võru Parish
- Time zone: UTC+2 (EET)
  - Summer (DST): UTC+3 (EEST)

Majala is a village in Võru Parish, Võru County in southern Estonia. 1991–2017 this village belonged to Sõmerpalu Parish.

As of 2019 there lives 10 people.
