= Sõmerpalu =

Borough in Estonia

Sõmerpalu Sõmmõrpalo (in Võro)
- Small borough
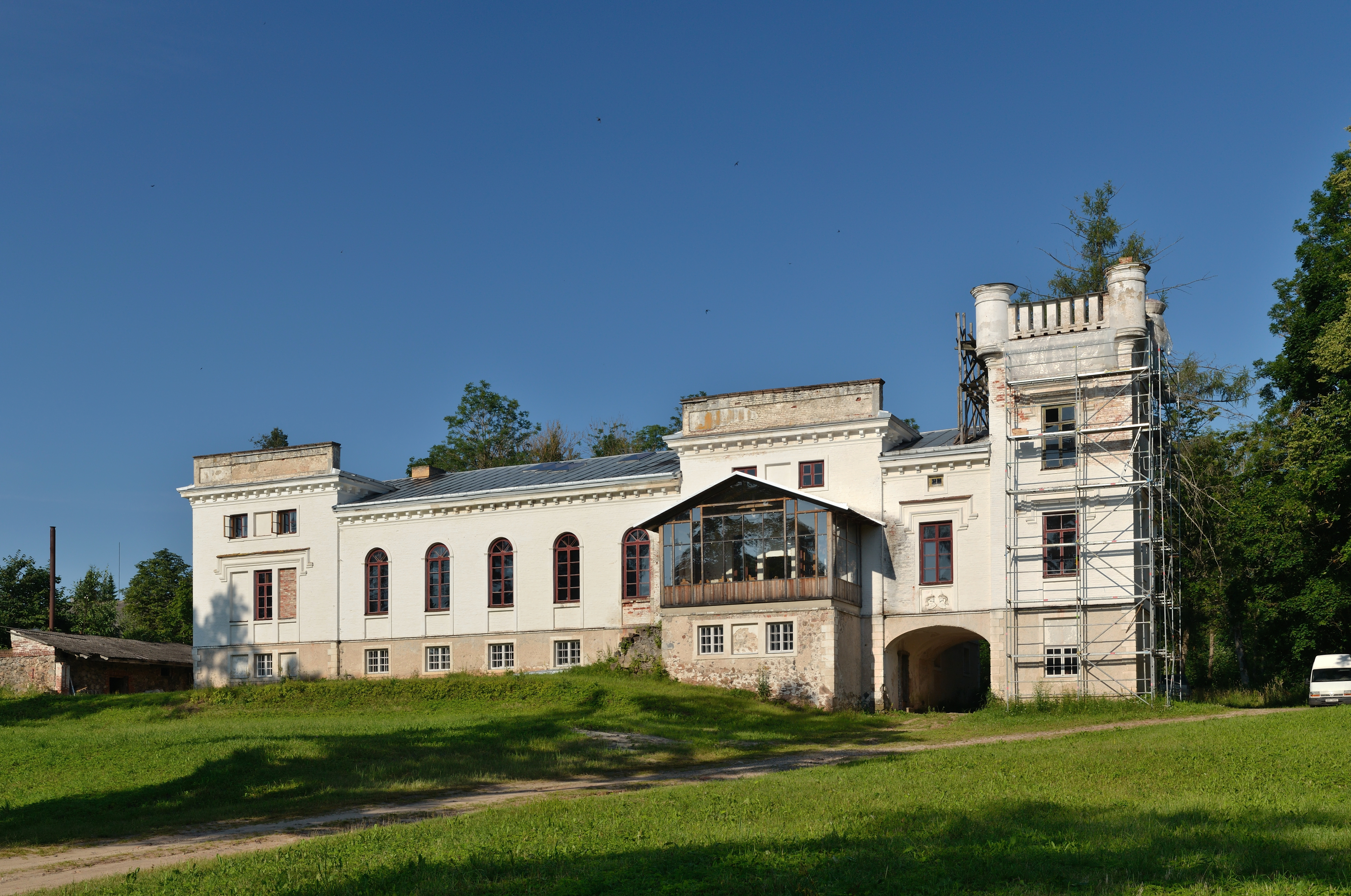
- Sõmerpalu manor

- Location in Estonia
- Coordinates: 57°51′07″N 26°49′45″E
- Country: Estonia
- County: Võru County
- Municipality: Võru Parish

Sõmerpalu (Võro: Sõmmõrpalo, German: Sommerpahlen) is a small borough (Estonian: alevik) in Võru County, Estonia. Between 1991–2017, until the administrative reform of Estonian local governments, the small town was the administrative center of Sõmerpalu Parish. As of 2017, it belongs to Võru Parish.

== Sõmerpalu manor ==
The history of the local manor goes back to at least 1544, when there was a fortified manor, a so-called "vassal castle", at approximately the same site as the present-day manor house. During the Livonian War, however, this building was destroyed, and a new manor house was built some time after this. The present house was erected by the family von Moeller in the 1860s in the then-popular neo-Gothic style.

== See also ==
- List of palaces and manor houses in Estonia
