= Hänike =

Village in Estonia

- Village
- Location within Estonia
- Coordinates: 57.8425°N 26.77°E
- Country: Estonia
- County: Võru County
- Parish: Võru Parish
- Time zone: UTC+2 (EET)
  - Summer (DST): UTC+3 (EEST)

Hänike is a village in Võru Parish, Võru County in Estonia.

The southern part of Hänike village territory is occupied by Nursipalu training area used by the Estonian Defence Forces.
