= Heeska =

Village in Estonia

- Village
- Location within Estonia
- Coordinates: 57.894722222222°N 26.725°E
- Country: Estonia
- County: Võru County
- Parish: Võru Parish
- Time zone: UTC+2 (EET)
  - Summer (DST): UTC+3 (EEST)

Heeska is a village in Võru Parish, Võru County in Estonia. It lies in the rural countryside of Võru County, surrounded by other small localities and hamlets, a typical small rural community with relatively low population and a traditional countryside landscapes.
