= Rummi =

Village in Estonia

- Village
- Location in Estonia
- Coordinates: 57°54′33″N 26°42′46″E
- Country: Estonia
- County: Võru County
- Municipality: Võru Parish

Rummi is a village in Võru Parish, Võru County, in southeastern Estonia.
