= Kurenurme =

Village in Estonia

Kurenurme Kurõnurmõ (in Võro)
- village
- Location in Estonia
- Coordinates: 57°50′15″N 26°48′11″E
- Country: Estonia
- County: Võru County
- Municipality: Võru Parish

Population (2000)
  - Total: 73

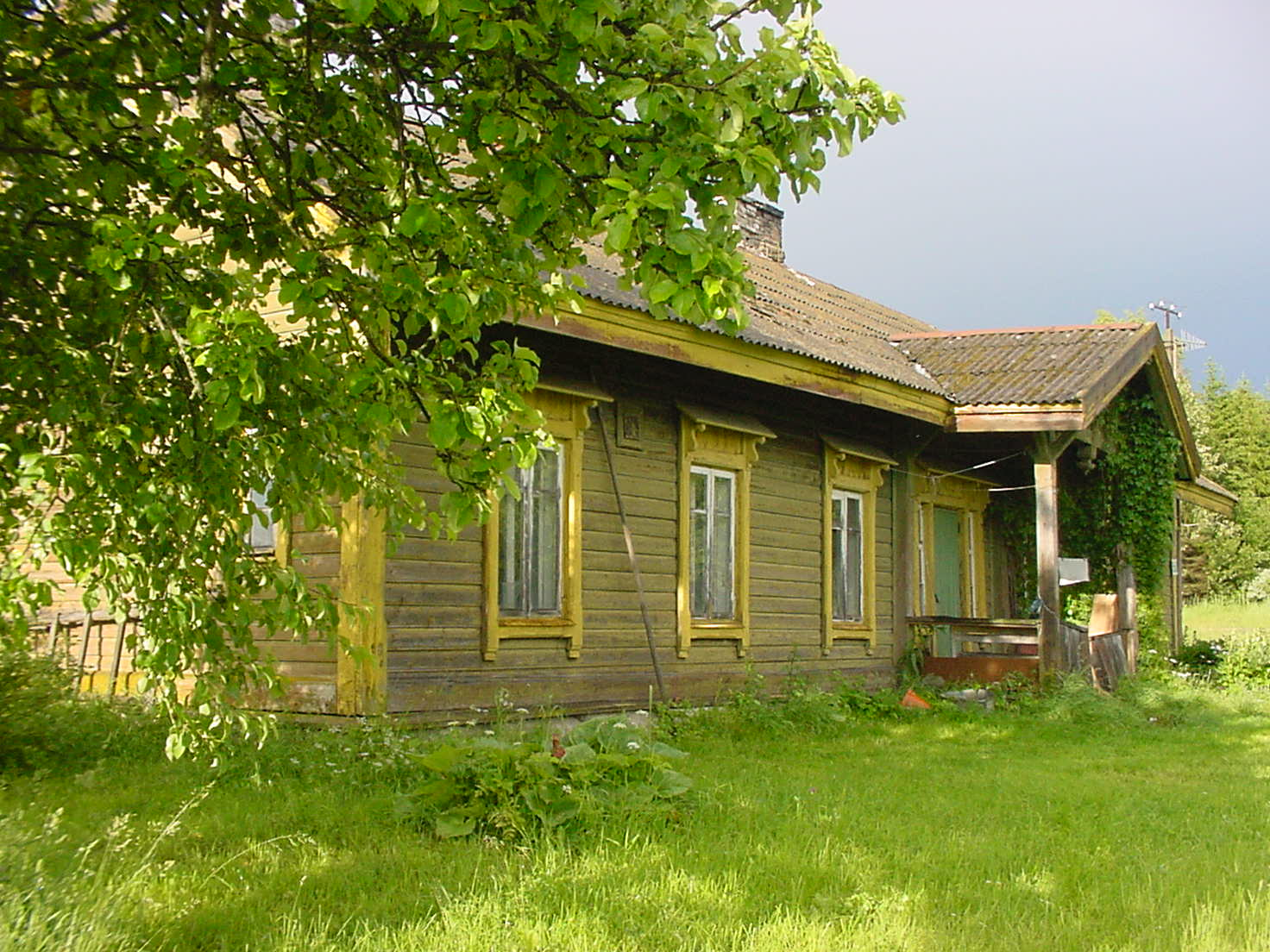
Picturesque house in Kurenurme

Kurenurme (Võro: Kurõnurmõ) is a village in Võru Parish, Võru County, in southeastern Estonia. As of 2000 it had a population of 73.

Kurenurme was founded as a lumberjack village in the beginning of the 19th century.

Kurenurme kool was founded in 1931, it was closed in 2001.

Kurenurme has a station on currently inactive Valga–Pechory railway.
