= Keema, Estonia =

Village in Estonia

Keema
- Village
- Location in Estonia
- Coordinates: 57°49′52″N 26°40′26″E
- Country: Estonia
- County: Võru County
- Municipality: Võru Parish

Keema is a village in Võru Parish, Võru County, in southeastern Estonia.

Opera singer Väino Puura was born in Keema village.
