= Varese, Estonia =

Village in Estonia

Varese
- Village
- Location in Estonia
- Coordinates: 57°52′23″N 26°48′35″E
- Country: Estonia
- County: Võru County
- Municipality: Võru Parish

Varese is a village in Võru Parish, Võru County, in southeastern Estonia.
