= Linnamäe, Võru County =

Village in Estonia

- Village
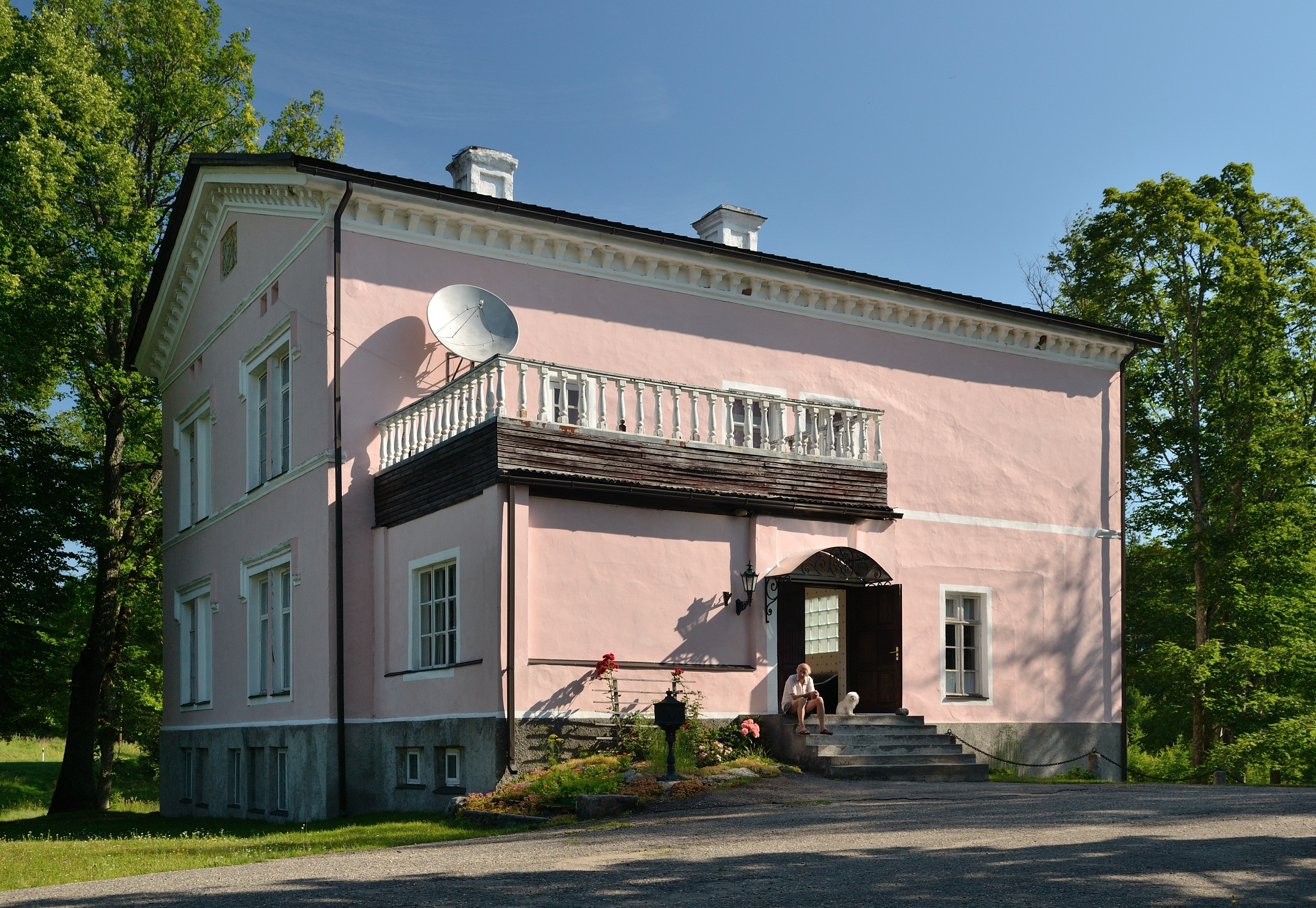
- Linnamaë manor house, established in 1748.

- Location within Estonia
- Coordinates: 57.880555555556°N 26.721944444444°E
- Country: Estonia
- County: Võru County
- Parish: Võru Parish
- Time zone: UTC+2 (EET)
  - Summer (DST): UTC+3 (EEST)

Linnamäe is a village in Võru Parish, Võru County in Estonia.
