= Vastse-Kuuste Parish =

Former municipality of Estonia

Coordinates: 58°9′59″N 26°55′58″E

Vastse-Kuuste Parish Vastse-Kuuste vald
- Former municipality of Estonia
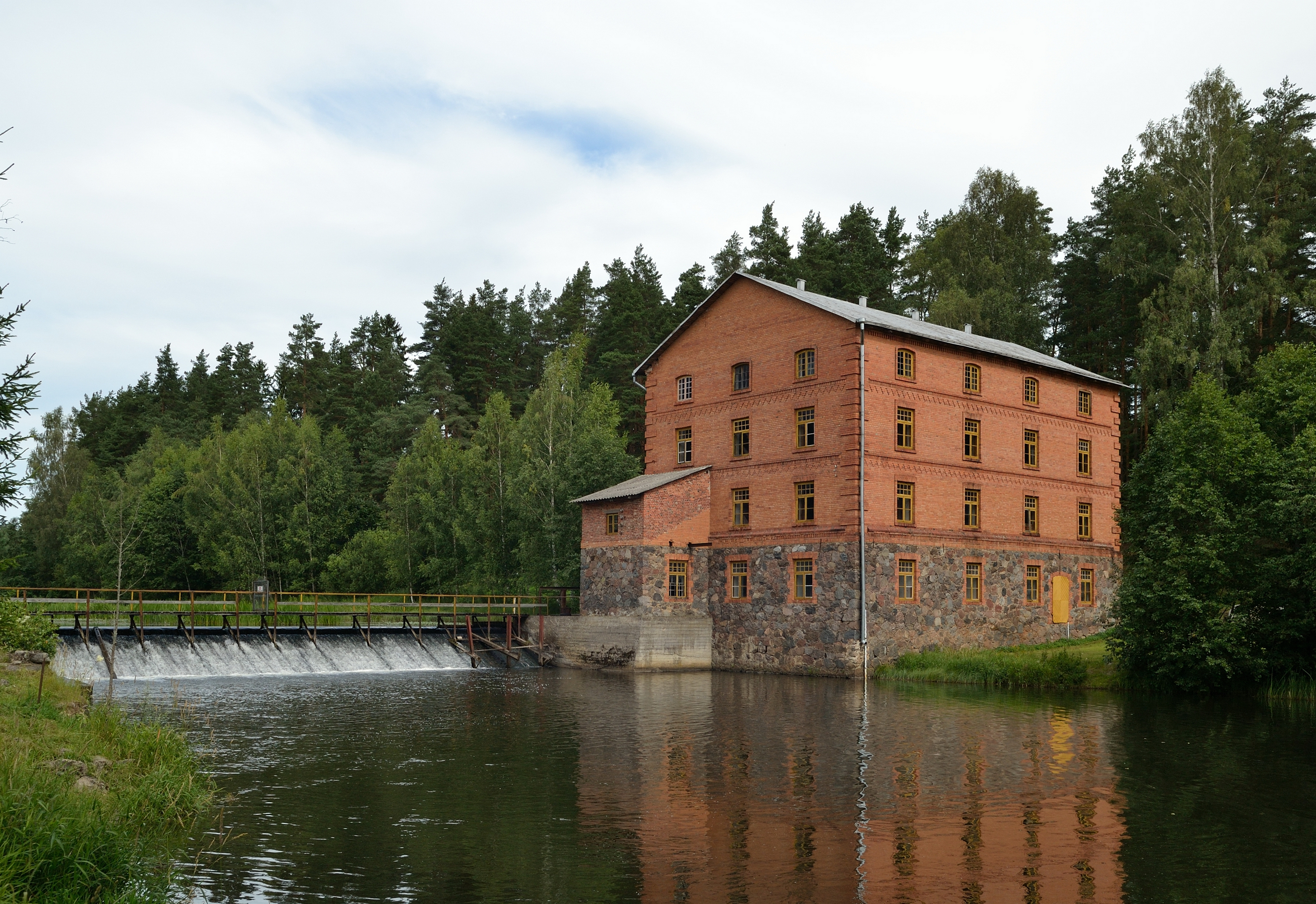
- Kiidjärve water mill

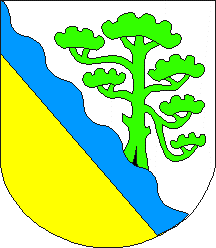
- Flag Coat of arms

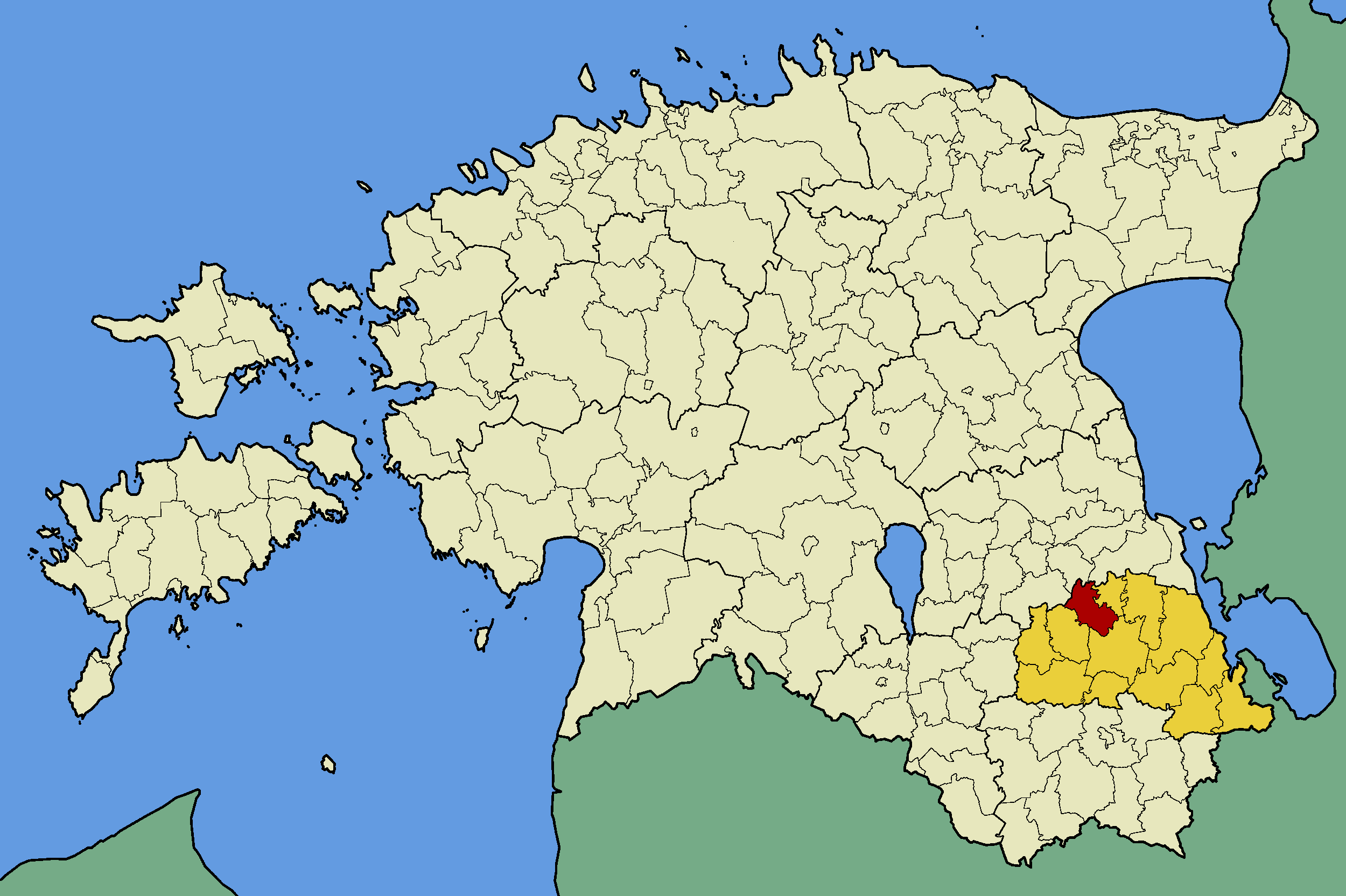
- Vastse-Kuuste Parish within Põlva County.
- Country: Estonia
- County: Põlva County
- Administrative centre: Vastse-Kuuste

Area
  - Total: 123.01 km^{2} (47.49 sq mi)

Population (01.01.2009)
  - Total: 1,255
  - Density: 10.20/km^{2} (26.42/sq mi)
- Website: sites.google.com/site/vastsekuuste

Vastse-Kuuste Parish (Estonian: Vastse-Kuuste vald) was a rural municipality of Estonia, in Põlva County. It had a population of 1,255 (as of 1 January 2009) and an area of 123.01 km².

== Settlements ==
Small borough

Vastse-Kuuste

Villages

Karilatsi - Kiidjärve - Koorvere - Leevijõe - Logina - Lootvina - Padari - Popsiküla - Valgemetsa - Vooreküla
