= Laheda Parish =

Former municipality of Estonia

Coordinates: 57°58′7″N 27°0′2″E

Laheda Parish Laheda vald
- Former municipality of Estonia
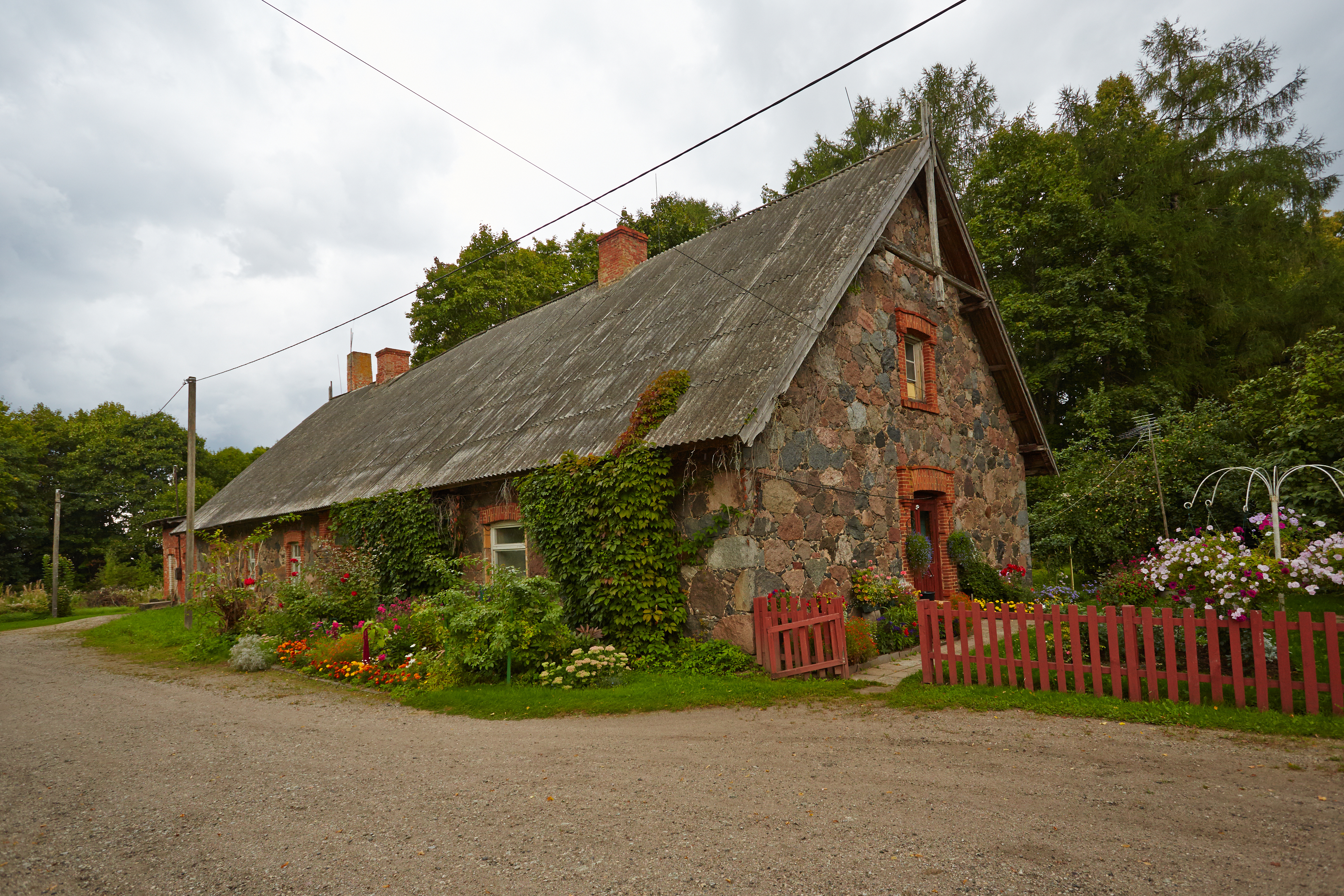
- Tilsi manor dairy

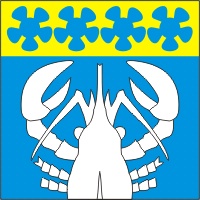
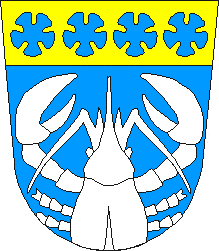
- Flag Coat of arms

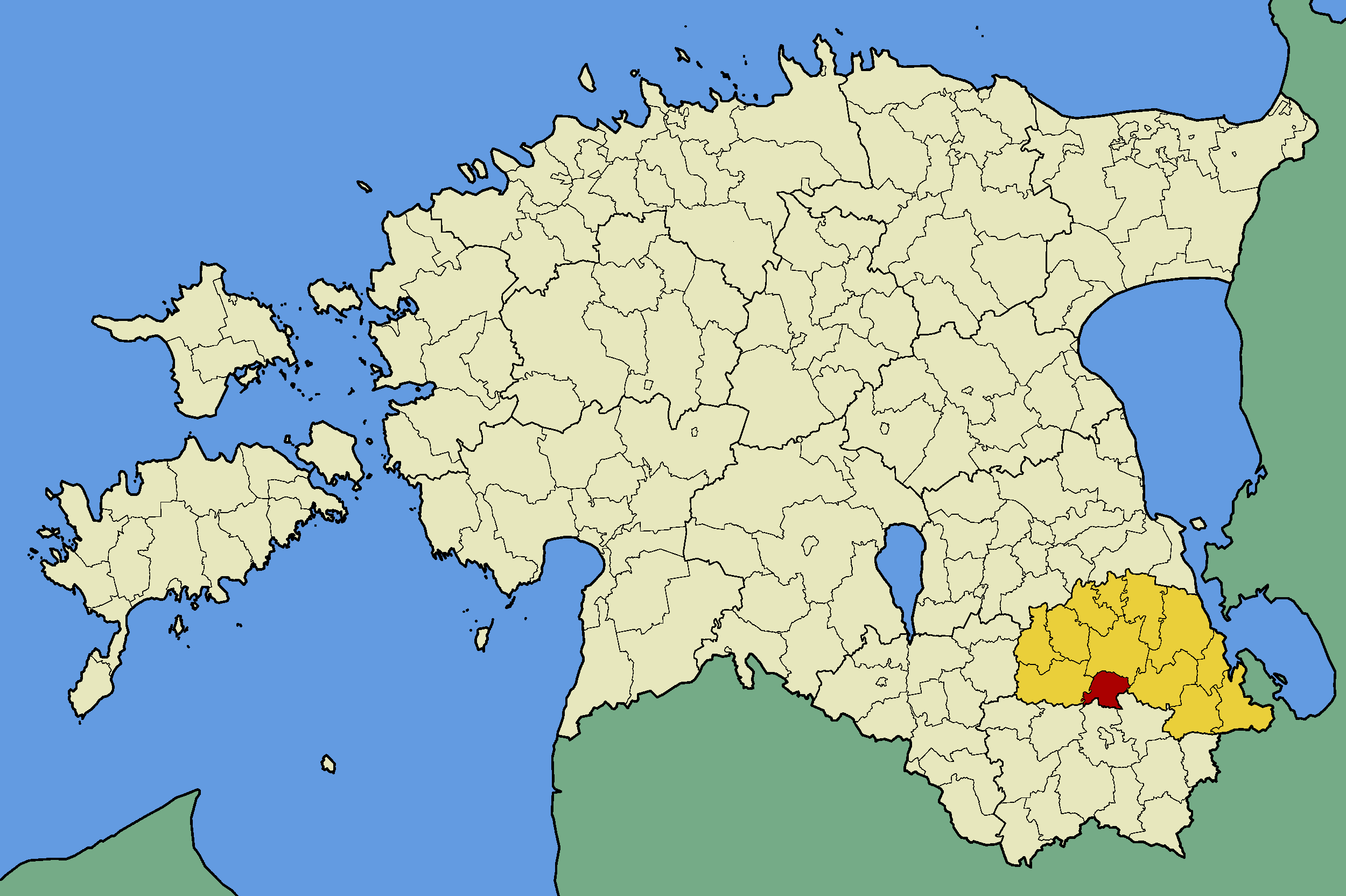
- Laheda Parish within Põlva County.
- Country: Estonia
- County: Põlva County
- Administrative centre: Tilsi

Area
  - Total: 91.47 km^{2} (35.32 sq mi)

Population (01.01.2009)
  - Total: 1,355
  - Density: 14.81/km^{2} (38.37/sq mi)
- Website: www.laheda.ee

Laheda Parish (Estonian: Laheda vald) was a rural municipality of Estonia, in Põlva County. It had a population of 1,355 on 1 January 2009 and an area of 91.47 km².

Ridali Airfield was located in Laheda Parish.

== Settlements ==
Villages

Himma - Joosu - Lahe - Mustajõe - Naruski - Pragi - Roosi - Suurküla - Tilsi - Vana-Koiola - Vardja
