= Ahja Parish =

Former rural municipality in Estonia

Coordinates: 58°12′26″N 27°4′28″E

Ahja Parish Ahja vald
- Former municipality
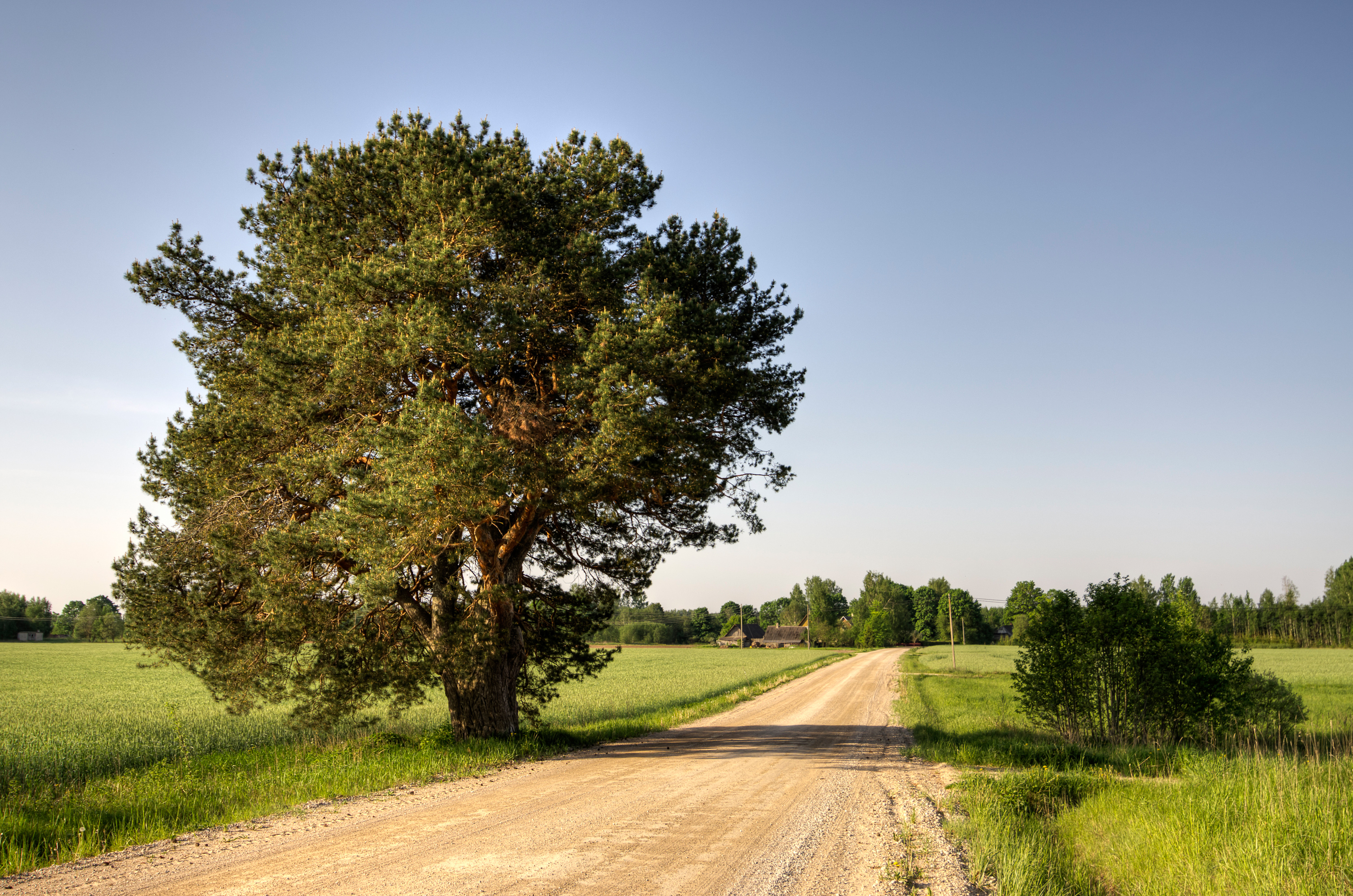
- Pine tree on a country road in Akste

- Flag Coat of arms

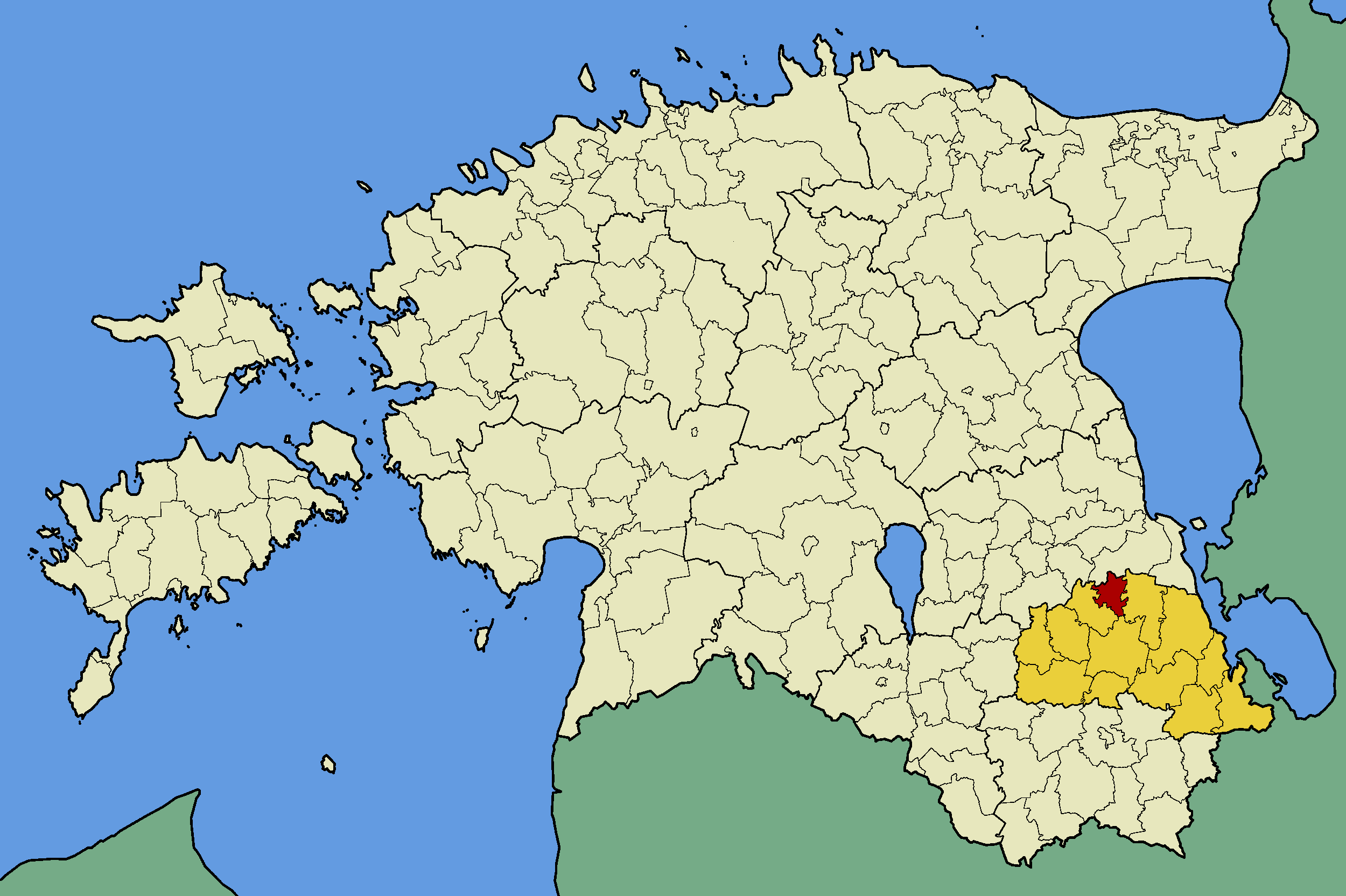
- Ahja Parish within Põlva County.
- Country: Estonia
- County: Põlva County
- Administrative centre: Ahja

Area
  - Total: 72.10 km^{2} (27.84 sq mi)

Population (01.01.2015)
  - Total: 963
  - Density: 13.4/km^{2} (34.6/sq mi)
- Website: www.ahja.ee

Ahja Parish (Estonian: Ahja vald) was a rural municipality of Estonia, in Põlva County. It had a population of 963 (as of 1. January 2015) and an area of 72.10 km^{2} (28 sq mi).

== Settlements ==
Small borough
Ahja

Villages
Akste
Ibaste
Kärsa
Kosova
Loko
Mõtsküla
Mustakurmu
Vanamõisa
