= Mihkel Härms =

Estonian ornithologist (1874–1941)

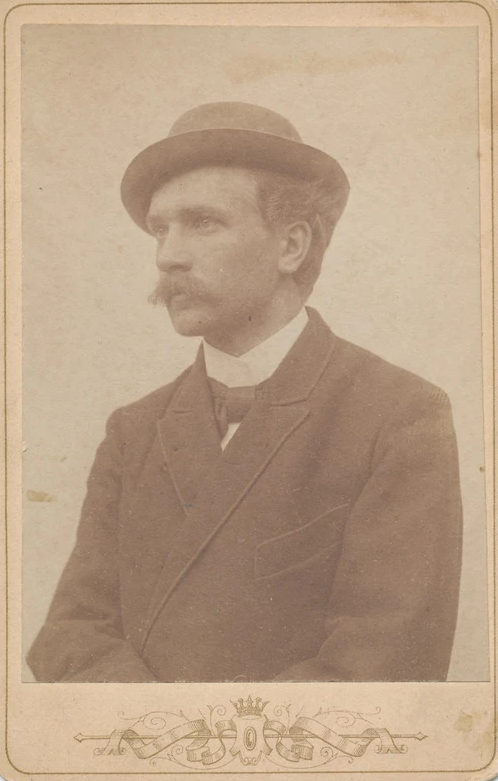
Mihkel Härms

Mihkel Härms (8 February 1874 – 20 September 1941) was an Estonian ornithologist. He worked at the zoological museum of the University of Tartu and became the first professional ornithologist in Estonia. He was a founding member of the Estonian Ornithological Society (Estonian: Eesti Ornitoloogiaühing) in 1921.

== Life and work ==
Härms was born in Vanaküla village, Vana-Koiola Parish (present-day Põlva Parish), in the family of a farmer. He studied in the Otepää parish and at Tartu gymnasium. The family originated in the village of Himmaste, where a maternal uncle of Mihkel, Jakob Hurt, lived and worked as a tutor for the Middendorf family in Hellenurme. His namesake father died in 1890 and his mother Ann died in 1900 and he was then raised by his uncle. He learned to collect and preserve natural history specimens as an eighteen year old from Ernst von Middendorff (1851–1916) and by 1820 the 4000 specimens of the bird collection held in Hellenurme manor came under his care. Along with Middendorf and later on his own he conducted bird surveys to Matsalu Bay (1897), Kuramaa (1898), Northwest Estonia and the Pakri Islands (1898), Arkhangelsk Governorate (1899), Trans-Caspia, Turkestan and Eastern Persia (1900-01). He met and worked with Nikolai Zarudny and corresponded with many other ornithologists around Europe. In 1921 he was involved, along with Johannes Piiper, in the establishment of the Estonian ornithological society in collaboration with the university rector Heinrich Koppel who was married to his sister Sophie Härms. He was involved in organizing the museum of the University of Tartu in 1922. In 1927 he published a catalogue of the birds of Estonia. He retired in 1939.

Härms was married firstly in 1903 to Adele Caroline Kõrs (1882–1914). Secondly he married Nadezhda Siirak (born 1888) in 1934. He died from a heart failure in Elva.

== Published notes ==
- Härms, M. (1900). "Beiträge zur Kenntnis der ornithologischen Fauna des Archangelsker Gouvernements". Ornithologisches Jahrbuch. 11 (3): 81–106. doi:10.1007/BF02250261.
- Sarudny N.; Härms, M. (1900). "Über eine neue Form der Sumpfmeise. Poecile salicaria neglecta nov. subsp". Ornithol. Monatsb. 8 (2): 19–20.
- Sarudny N.; Härms, M. (1900). "Bemerkung zu Poecile salicaria neglecta Zarudny et Härms". Ornithol. Monatsb. 8 (5): 67.
- Sarudny N.; Härms, M. (1902). "Neue Vogelarten". Ornithol. Monatsb. 10 (4): 49–55.
- Sarudny N.; Härms, M. (1911). "Tchitrea paradisi turkestanica subsp. nov". Ornithol. Monatsb. 19 (5): 85–86.
- Sarudny N.A.; Härms, M. (1912). "Bemerkung über den Paradiesfliegenschnapper aus Ceylon". Ornithol. Monatsb. 20 (4): 58–60.
- Sarudny N.; Härms, M. (1912). "Bemerkungen über einige Vogel Persiens" (PDF). Journal für Ornithologie. 60: 592–619.
- Sarudny N.; Härms, M. (1913). "Bemerkungen über einige Vogel Persiens". Journal für Ornithologie. 61: 630–661. doi:10.1007/BF02250361.
- Sarudny N.; Härms, M. (1913). "Neue Formen der Frankoline aus Persien". Ornithol. Monatsb. 21 (4): 53–55.
- Sarudny N.; Härms, M. (1913). "Über Parus bokharensis Licht. und seine nachsten Verwandtern". Ornithol. Monatsb. 21 (9): 141–143.
- Sarudny N.; Härms, M. (1914). "Vorlaufige Bemerkung über zwei neue Formen der Berghauflinge aus dem Russischen Turkestan". Ornithol. Monatsb. 22 (4): 53–54.
- Sarudny N.; Härms, M. (1914). "Bemerkungen über einige Vogel der Ostseeprovinzen". Ornithol. Monatsb. 22 (7/8): 101–106.
- Sarudny N.; Härms, M. (1923). "Bemerkungen über einige Vogel Persiens. Th. 3. Gattung Sitta L.". J. Ornithol. 71 (4): 398–421. doi:10.1007/BF01975086. hdl:10062/115196.
- Härms, M. (1925). "UeberOenanthe xanthoprymna (Hempr. und Ehrb.)". Journal für Ornithologie (in German). 73 (3): 390–394. doi:10.1007/BF01906397. ISSN 0021-8375.
- Sarudny N.; Härms, M. (1926). "Bemerkungen über einige Vogel Persiens. Th. 4. Gattung Oenanthe". J. Ornithol. 74 (1): 1–52. doi:10.1007/BF01982296.
