= Kivijärv (Uibujärve) =

Lake in Estonia

- Location within Estonia
- Coordinates: 58.0411019°N 27.1985023°E
- Basin countries: Estonia
- Max. length: 680 meters (2,230 ft)
- Surface area: 6.1 hectares (15 acres)
- Max. depth: 15.0 meters (49.2 ft)
- Shore length^{1}: 1,530 meters (5,020 ft)
- Surface elevation: 58.7 meters (193 ft)
- ^{1} Shore length is not a well-defined measure.

Kivijärv (also Holvandi Kivijärv) is a lake in Estonia. It is located in the village of Uibujärve in Põlva Parish, Põlva County.

== Physical description ==
The lake has an area of 6.1 hectares (15 acres). The lake has a maximum depth of 15.0 meters (49.2 ft). It is 680 meters (2,230 ft) long, and its shoreline measures 1,530 meters (5,020 ft).

== See also ==
- List of lakes of Estonia
