= Vanaküla, Põlva County =

Village in Estonia

Coordinates: 58°04′16″N 27°10′42″E

Vanaküla
- Village
- Interactive map of Vanaküla
- Country: Estonia
- County: Põlva County
- Parish: Põlva Parish
- Time zone: UTC+2 (EET)
  - Summer (DST): UTC+3 (EEST)

Vanaküla is a village in Põlva Parish, Põlva County in southeastern Estonia.

== Name ==
Vanaküla was attested in written sources as Wanna Kuella in 1627 and Wannakülla in 1638. The name literally means 'old village'. Vanaküla covered a large area in the 17th century, including what are now the separate villages of Kiisa, Holvandi, and Lutsu, and parcels were still being split off from it for farms even in the 19th century. The name thus refers to the "parent" status of the village as a source of territory for newer settlements.
