= Akste Nature Reserve =

Protected area in Estonia

Coordinates: 58°10′04″N 27°00′58″E

- Location within Estonia
- Location: Estonia
- Area: 189.2 ha (468 acres)
- Established: 1977

Akste Nature Reserve is a nature reserve in Vastse-Kuuste, Põlva County, Estonia. The area is 189.2 ha. The nature reserve was established in 1977 to protect the woodcock.
