= Kähri =

Kähri may refer to several villages in Estonia:

- Kähri, Põlva County, village in Põlva Parish, Põlva County
- Kähri, Valga County, village in Otepää Parish, Valga County
- Kähri, Võru County, village in Rõuge Parish, Võru County
