= Põlva Parish =

Municipality of Estonia (2017)

Coordinates: 58°2′32″N 27°3′57″E

Põlva Parish Põlva vald
- Municipality of Estonia
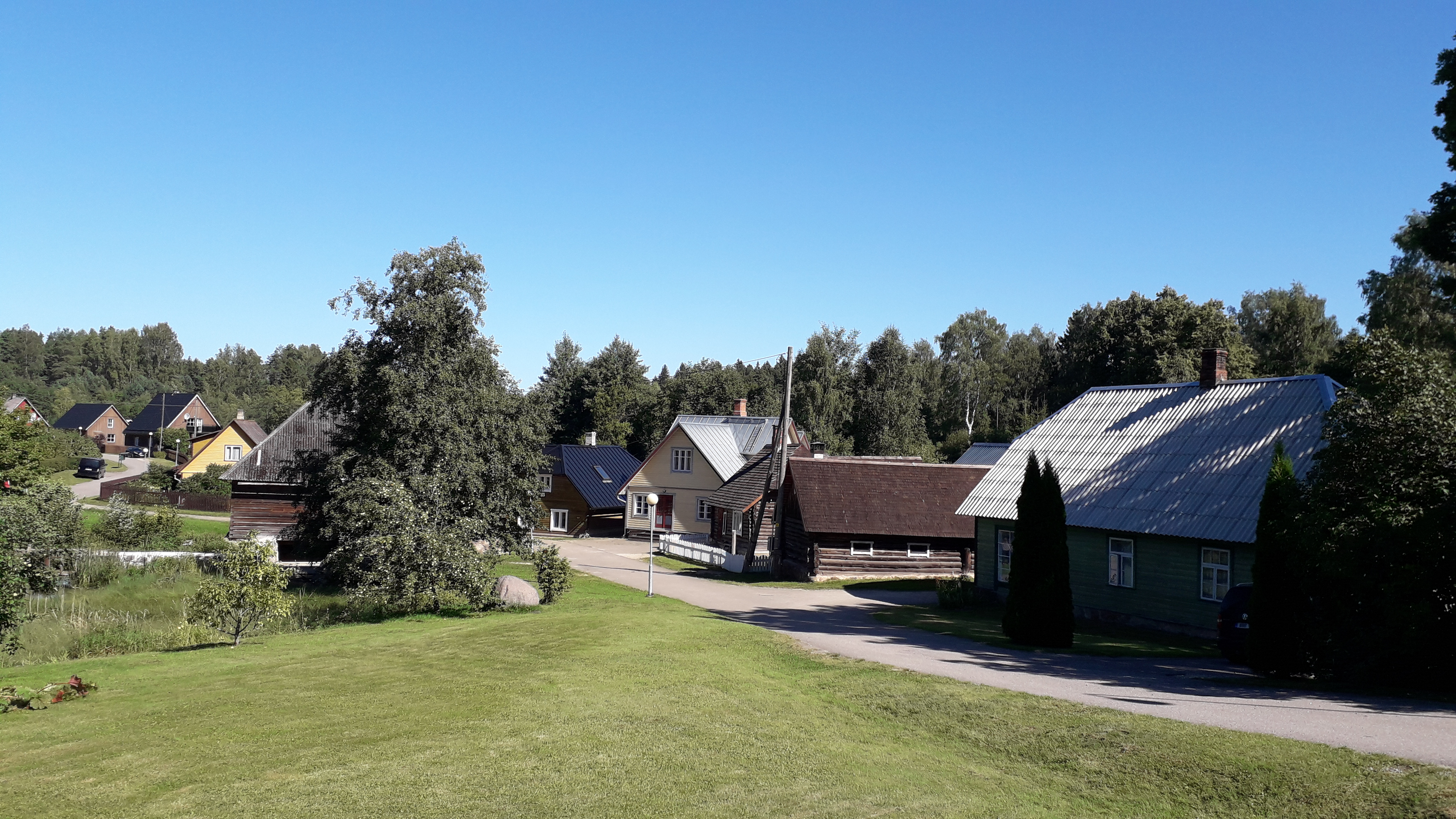

- Flag Coat of arms

- Põlva Parish within Põlva County
- Country: Estonia
- County: Põlva County
- Administrative centre: Põlva

Area
  - Total: 706 km^{2} (273 sq mi)

Population
  - Total: 14,600
  - Density: 20.7/km^{2} (53.6/sq mi)
- ISO 3166 code: EE-622
- Website: www.polva.ee

Põlva Parish (Estonian: Põlva vald) is a rural municipality in Põlva County, southeastern Estonia.

On 1 January 2009, it had a population of 3,882 and an area of 228.63 km^{2}. In October 2013, the town of Põlva (formerly a separate municipality) was merged into Põlva Parish, becoming the centre of it. In 2017, as part of the administrative reform, the neighbouring Ahja, Laheda, Mooste and Vastse-Kuuste parishes were merged with Põlva Parish.

== Settlements ==
Town
Põlva

Small boroughs
Ahja - Mooste - Vastse-Kuuste

Villages
Aarna - Adiste - Akste - Andre - Eoste - Himma - Himmaste - Holvandi - Ibaste - Jaanimõisa - Joosu - Kaaru - Kadaja - Kanassaare - Karilatsi - Kastmekoja - Kauksi - Kiidjärve - Kiisa - Kiuma - Koorvere - Kosova - Kähri - Kärsa - Lahe - Laho - Leevijõe - Logina - Loko - Lootvina - Lutsu - Mammaste - Meemaste - Metste - Miiaste - Mustajõe - Mustakurmu - Mõtsküla - Naruski - Nooritsmetsa - Orajõe - Padari - Partsi - Peri - Pragi - Puskaru - Puuri - Rasina - Roosi - Rosma - Savimäe - Soesaare - Suurküla - Suurmetsa - Säkna - Säässaare - Taevaskoja - Terepi - Tilsi - Tromsi - Tännassilma - Uibujärve - Valgemetsa - Valgesoo - Vana-Koiola - Vanaküla - Vanamõisa - Vardja - Viisli - Vooreküla

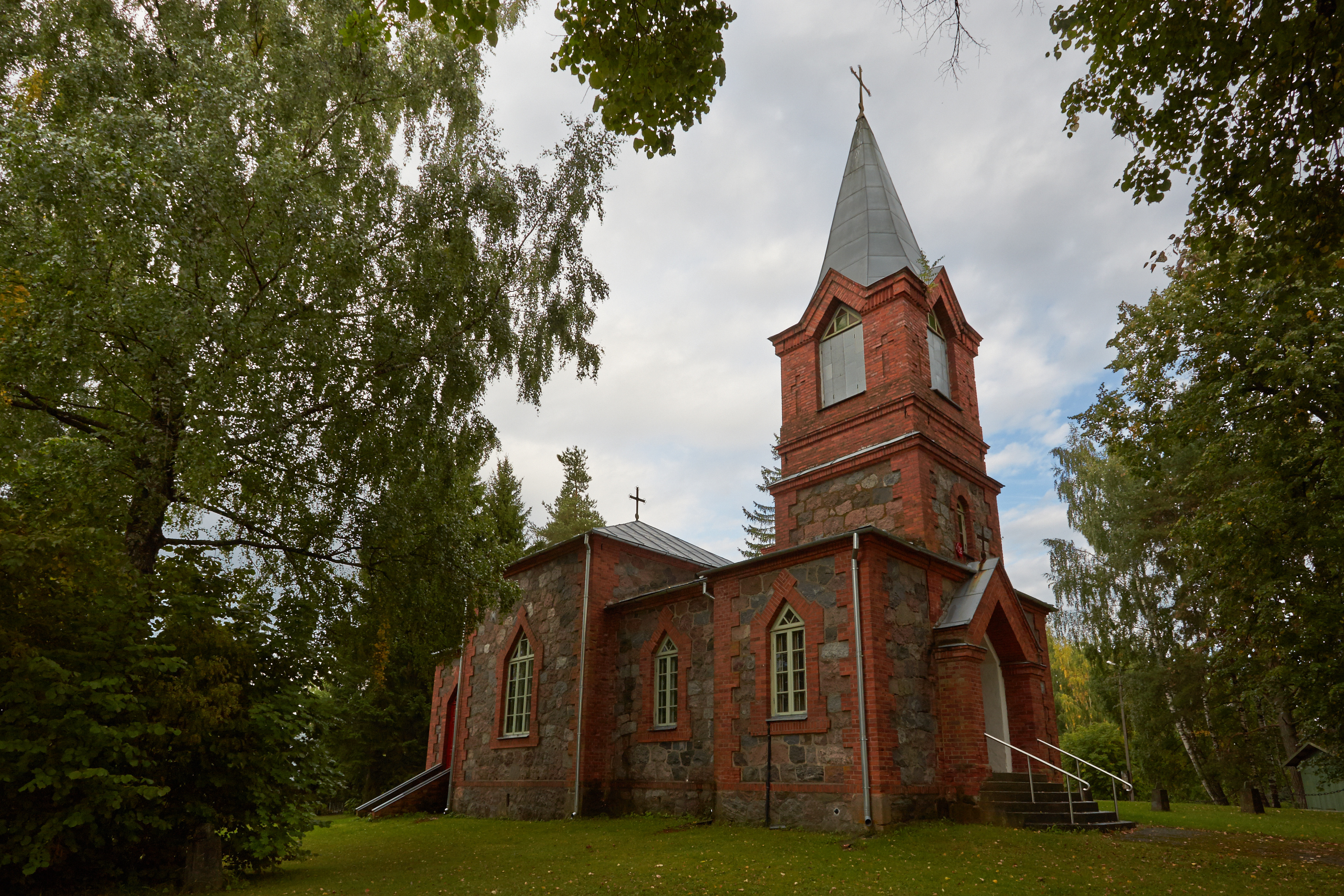
Kähri Orthodox Church (2013)

In the 2021 census of at least 15-years old permanent residents of the parish 10.4 per cent declared themselves Lutheran, 4.0 per cent declared themselves Orthodox, 1.2 per cent as others Christians. 81.8 per cent declared themselves religiously unaffiliated. 2.6 per cent of the population followed other religions or their affiliation remained unknown in the census.

== Notable people ==
- Jakob Hurt (1839 in Himmaste – 1907), folklorist, nationalist and theologian.
- Jaan Vahtra (1882 in Kaaru – 1947), modernist artist, printmaker; core member of the Group of Estonian Artists, founded in 1923 as an avant-garde art group.
- Alma Ostra-Oinas (1886 in Vastse-Kuuste – 1960), journalist, writer and politician.
- Friedebert Tuglas (1886 in Ahja – 1971), writer and critic, introduced Impressionism and Symbolism to Estonian literature
- Arno Niitov (1904 in Tilsi – 1989), opera and concert baritone, head of the voice dept. at the Tallinn Conservatory, 1940 to 1941
- Kalmer Tennosaar (1928 in Kiidjärve – 2004), singer and Eesti Televisioon journalist
- Jaan-Mati Punning (1940 in Mooste – 2009), geochemist, paleogeographer and ecologist.
- Ene Järvis (1947 in Kiidjärve – 2025), stage, film, radio and TV actress.
- Karin Jaani (1952 in Ahja – 2009), diplomat and politician, Ambassador of Estonia to Russian Federation.
- Tarmo Tamm (born 1953 in Kiuma), politician, the Mayor of Põlva, 1999 to 2011.
- Andrus Murumets (born 1978 in Ahja), strongman and police officer
- Signy Aarna (born 1990 in Ahja), footballer who has played over 240 games and 101 for Estonia women
- Eneli Kutter (born 1991 in Peri), footballer, who has played over 80 games and 61 for Estonia women
