= Orajõe =

Orajõe may refer to several places in Estonia:

- Orajõe, Pärnu County, village in Häädemeeste Parish, Pärnu County
- Orajõe, Põlva County, village in Põlva Parish, Põlva County
