= Henrik Koppel =

Estonian medical scientist

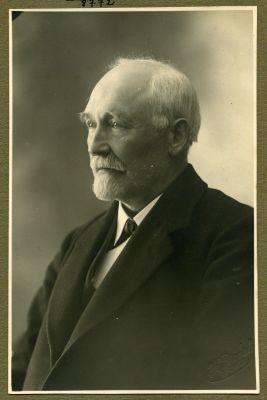
Henrik Koppel

Henrik Koppel (Germanized as Heinrich Koppel; 29 December 1863 Tõnuküla, Uusna Parish – 14 December 1944 Tallinn) was an Estonian medical researcher who served as a rector of the University of Tartu. He was involved in conservation and was a prominent founder of Estonian-language higher education.

== Life and work ==
Koppel was born in Naela farm in Uusna municipality, Viljandi County. After studies in the local municipal school, he went to Viljandi, and then Tartu where he graduated in 1884. He then went to study medicine at the University of Tartu graduating in 1890. He served as a chairperson of the Estonian Students' Society. He worked on his doctorate and became a private medical practitioner specialising in ear, nose and throat. He became a head of the medical outpatient clinic at the university and in 1920 he was appointed rector of Tartu University, a position he held until 1928. In 1903 he established the magazine Tervis ('Health'). Koppel worked on public health matters including work to end leprosy. He was also involved in nature conservation and was a founding member of the Estonian Ornithological Society in 1921.

In 1934 he was awarded the Order of the Estonian Red Cross, I class. He was also an honorary member of the Society of Finnish Doctors.

Koppel was married to Sophie, sister of Mihkel Härms. In 1944 he was in Tallinn where he suffered from gangrene in a leg. Medical aid was delayed due to the war and he died.
