= Puskaru =

Village in Estonia

Coordinates: 58°00′N 26°56′E

- Village
- Interactive map of Puskaru
- Country: Estonia
- County: Põlva County
- Parish: Põlva Parish
- Time zone: UTC+2 (EET)
  - Summer (DST): UTC+3 (EEST)

Puskaru is a village in Põlva Parish, Põlva County in southeastern Estonia.
