= Mammaste =

Village in Estonia

Mammaste Mamastõ
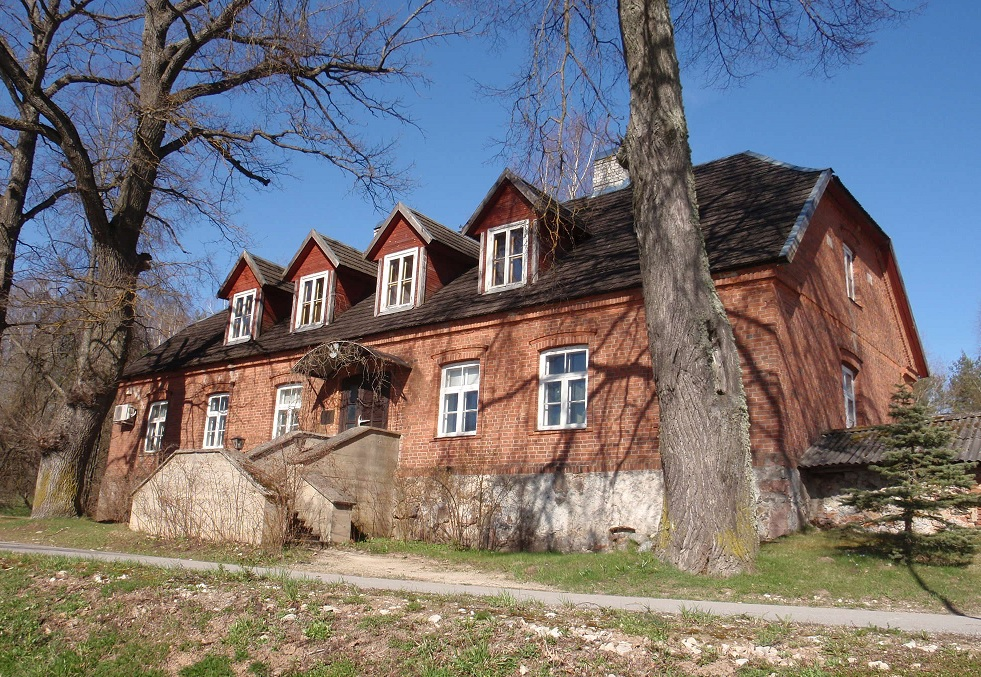
- Former Koiola Parish town hall in Mammaste

- Location within Estonia
- Coordinates: 58°4′0″N 27°2′43″E
- Country: Estonia
- County: Põlva County

Population (2019)
  - Total: 624
- Time zone: UTC+2 (EET)

Mammaste (Võro: Mamastõ) is a settlement in Põlva Parish, Põlva County in southeastern Estonia.

== Gallery ==
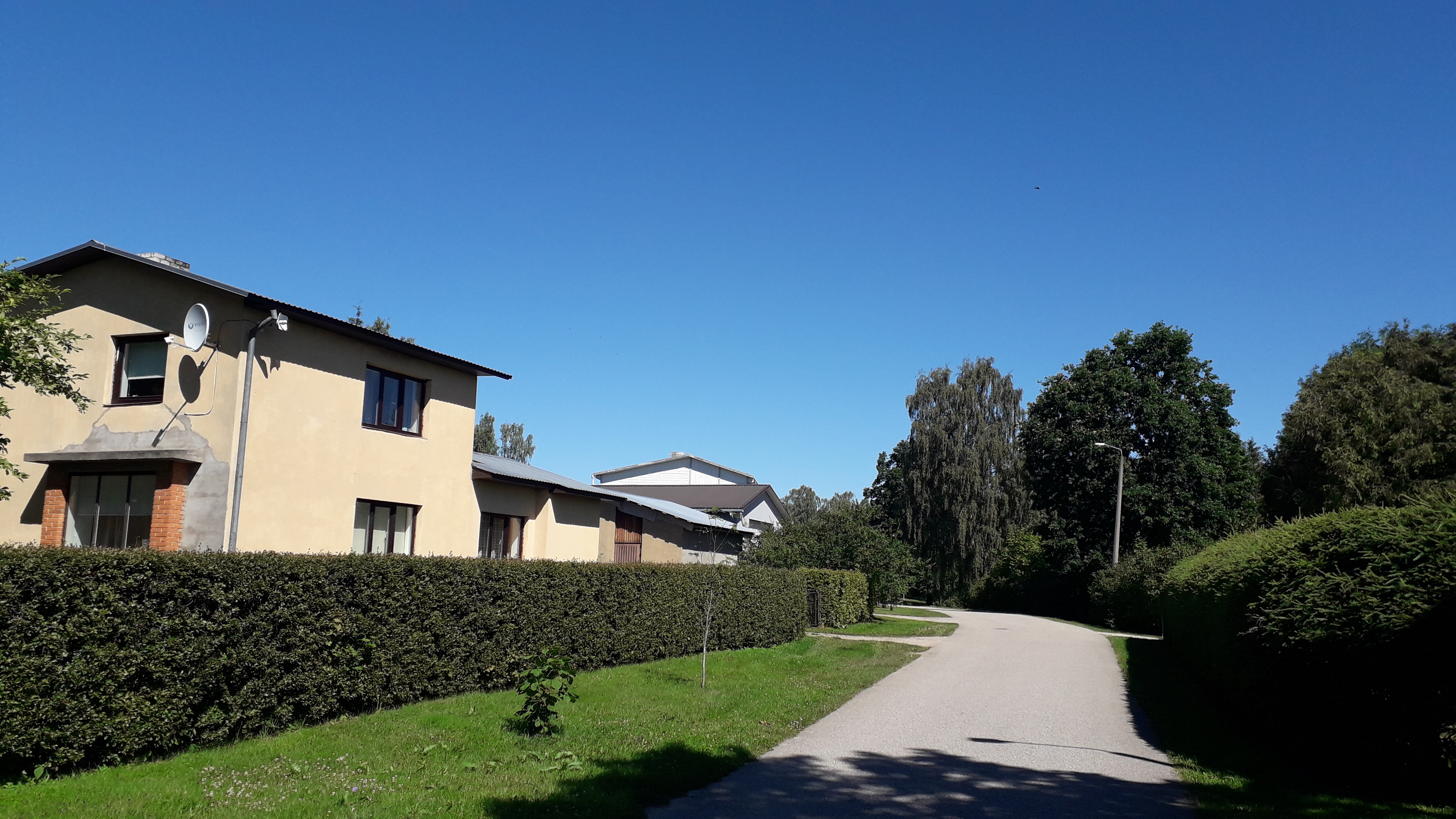
Mammaste

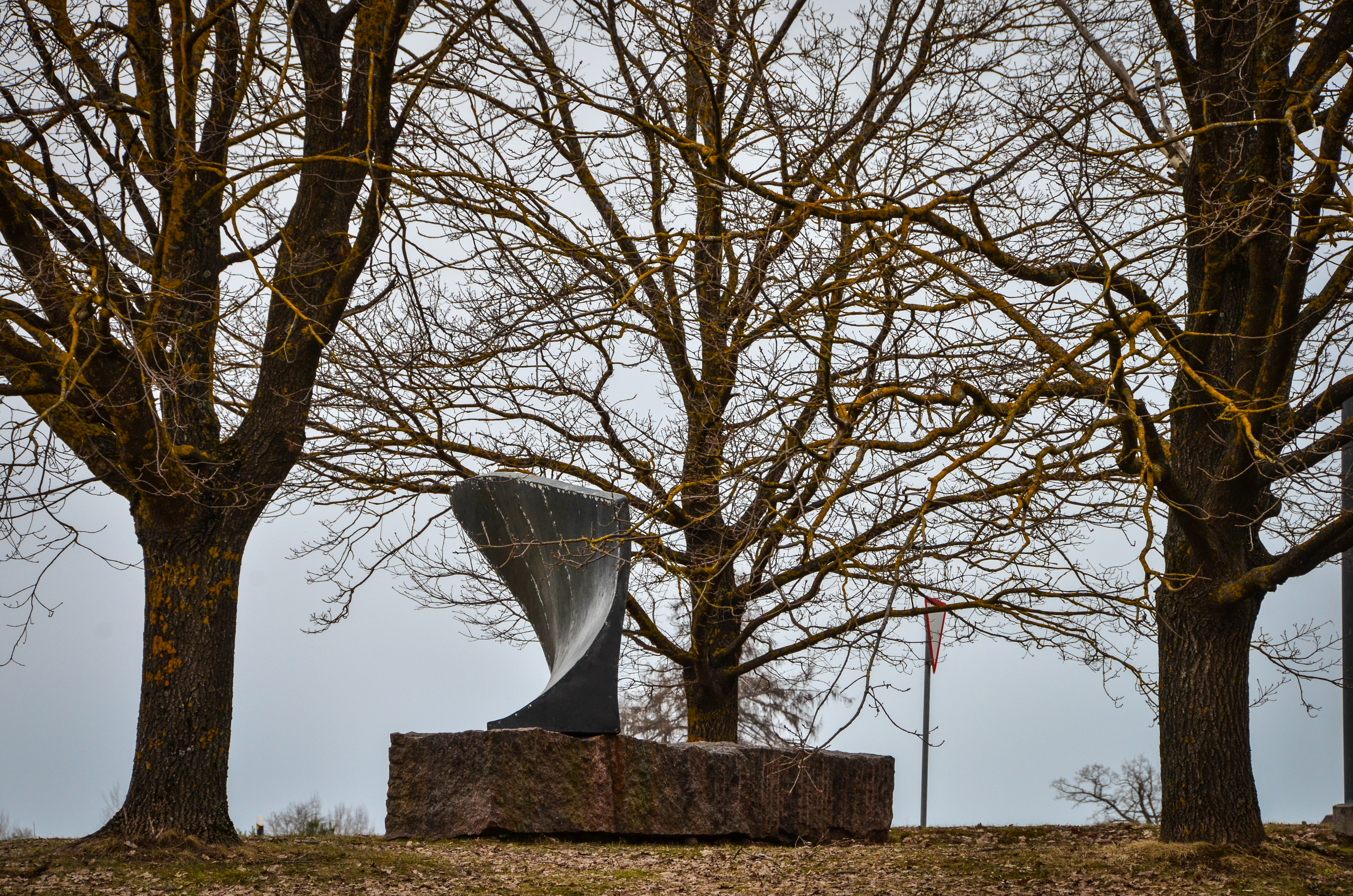
Monument from Soviet era in honor of the collectivisation of agriculture
