= Metste =

Village in Estonia

Metste, Estonia Metste küla
- Village, Hamlet
- Metste
- Location within Estonia
- Coordinates: 58°01′22″N 27°02′13″E
- Country: Estonia
- County: Põlva County
- Parish: Põlva Parish
- Elevation: 89 m (292 ft)

Population (2017)
  - Total: 105
- Time zone: UTC+2 (EET)
  - Summer (DST): UTC+3 (EEST)
- Postal code: 63213
- ISO 3166 code: EE-65

Metste is a village in Põlva Parish, Põlva County located in southeastern Estonia.
