= Meemaste =

Village in Estonia

Coordinates: 58.0187°N 27.0619°E

- Village
- Interactive map of Meemaste
- Country: Estonia
- County: Põlva County
- Parish: Põlva Parish
- Time zone: UTC+2 (EET)
  - Summer (DST): UTC+3 (EEST)

Meemaste is a village in Põlva Parish, Põlva County in southeastern Estonia.

Its population has decreased from 61 people in 2001 to 35 in 2021, according to their census.
