= Tännassilma, Põlva County =

Village in Estonia

Tännassilma
- Village
- Location within Estonia
- Coordinates: 58°02′06″N 27°00′04″E
- Country: Estonia
- County: Põlva County
- Parish: Põlva Parish

Population (2011)
  - Total: 182
- Time zone: UTC+2 (EET)
  - Summer (DST): UTC+3 (EEST)

Tännassilma is a village in Põlva Parish, Põlva County in southeastern Estonia.
