= Aarna =

Village in Estonia

- Village
- Location in Estonia
- Coordinates: 58°04′N 26°58′E
- Country: Estonia
- County: Põlva County
- Parish: Põlva Parish

Area
  - Total: 24.25 km^{2} (9.36 sq mi)

Population (2020)
  - Total: 233
  - Density: 9.61/km^{2} (24.9/sq mi)
- Time zone: UTC+2 (EET)
  - Summer (DST): UTC+3 (EEST)

Aarna is a village in Põlva Parish, Põlva County in southeastern Estonia.
