= Rosma =

Village in Estonia

Coordinates: 58°02′N 27°04′E

- Village
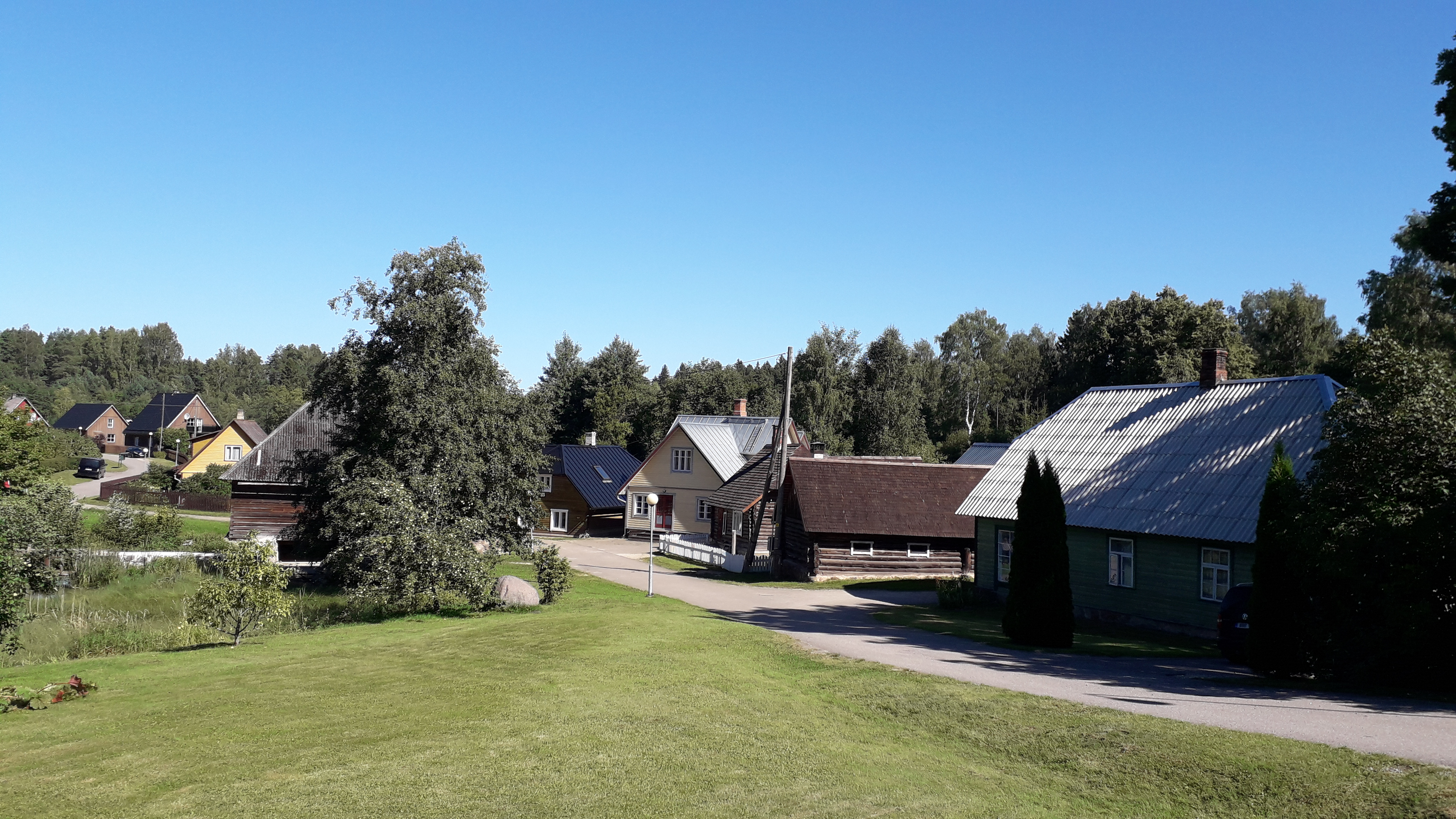
- Interactive map of Rosma
- Country: Estonia
- County: Põlva County
- Parish: Põlva Parish

Population (2019)
  - Total: 385
- Time zone: UTC+2 (EET)
  - Summer (DST): UTC+3 (EEST)

Rosma is a village in Põlva Parish, Põlva County in southeastern Estonia. Rosma history dates back to ancient times. The village on the border between Valgatabalwe and south-eastern part of Uganda, mentioned in the Livonian Chronicle, was one of the hubs of the trade routes at that time. The first records of Põlva Parish date from 13th century. The first records of the village of Rosma date back to 1638 (Rozma Kywi), when Rosma remained in the territory of the Kingdom Of Sweden after the Livonian War. from 1939, Rosma village belonged to Põlva municipality.
