= Jaanimõisa =

Village in Estonia

Coordinates: 58°08′N 27°16′E

- Village
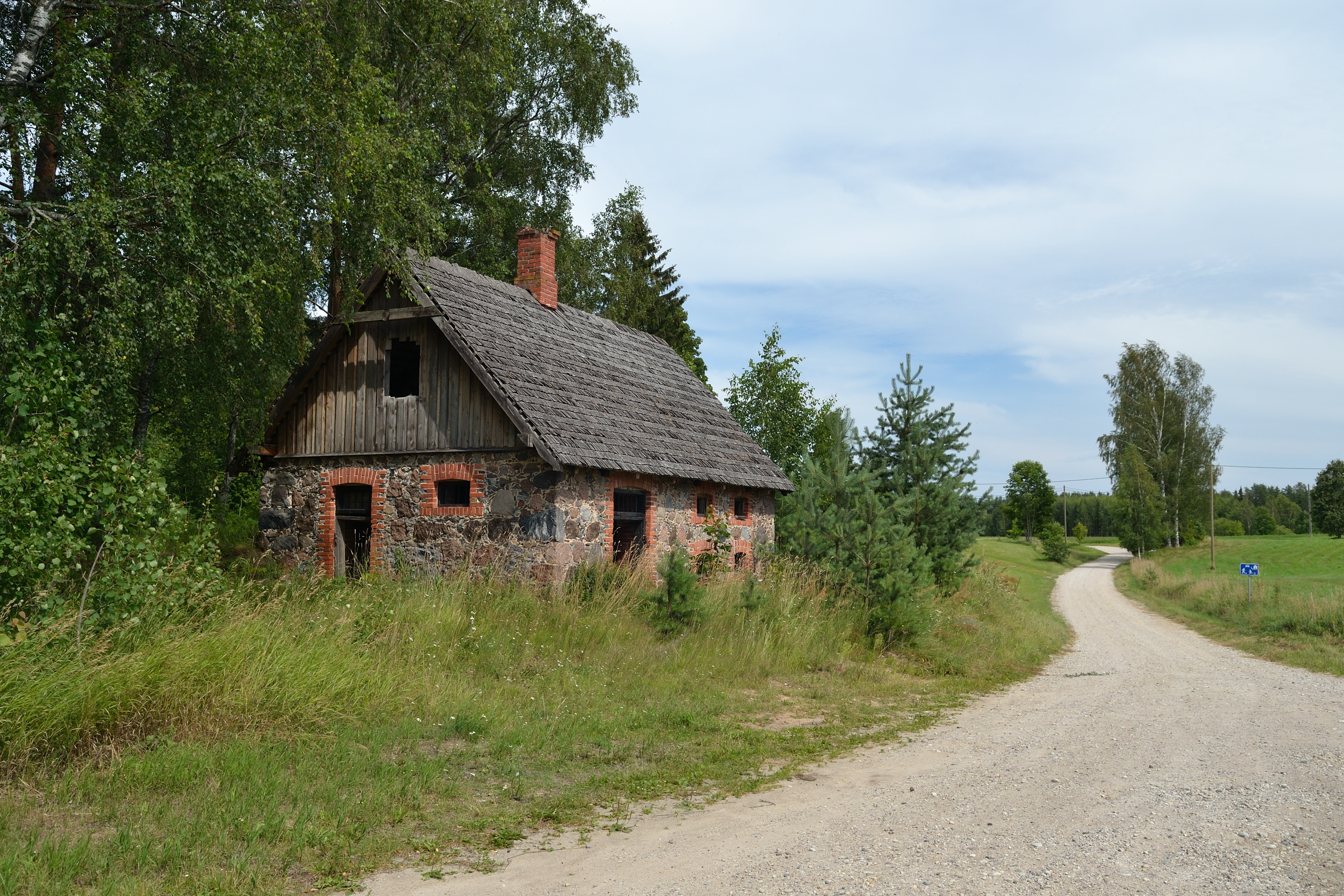
- Jaanimõisa manor granary-cereal dryer
- Interactive map of Jaanimõisa
- Country: Estonia
- County: Põlva County
- Parish: Põlva Parish
- Time zone: UTC+2 (EET)
  - Summer (DST): UTC+3 (EEST)

Jaanimõisa is a village in Põlva Parish, Põlva County in southeastern Estonia.
