= Eoste =

Village in Estonia

Coordinates: 58°06′N 27°06′E

Eoste Eostõ
- Village
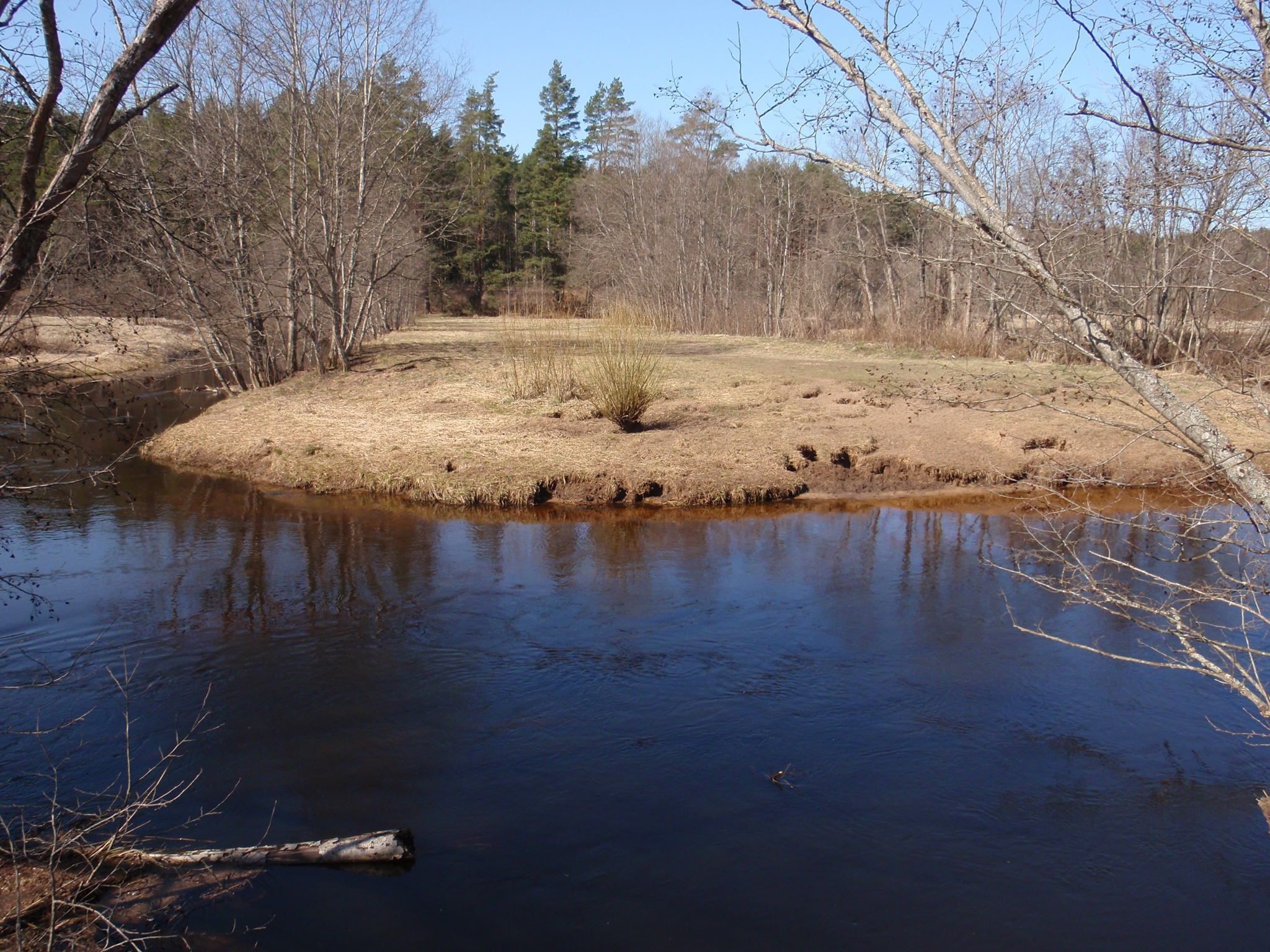
- Bend in the Ahja River in the Eoste Conservation Area
- Interactive map of Eoste
- Country: Estonia
- County: Põlva County
- Parish: Põlva Parish
- Time zone: UTC+2 (EET)
  - Summer (DST): UTC+3 (EEST)

Eoste (Võro: Eostõ) is a small village in Põlva Parish, Põlva County in southeastern Estonia.
