= Viisli =

Village in Estonia

Coordinates: 58°11′N 27°12′E

- Village
- Interactive map of Viisli
- Country: Estonia
- County: Põlva County
- Parish: Põlva Parish
- Time zone: UTC+2 (EET)
  - Summer (DST): UTC+3 (EEST)

Viisli is a village in Põlva Parish, Põlva County in southeastern Estonia.
