= Kastmekoja =

Village in Estonia

Coordinates: 58°15′N 27°13′E

- Village
- Interactive map of Kastmekoja
- Country: Estonia
- County: Põlva County
- Parish: Põlva Parish
- Time zone: UTC+2 (EET)
  - Summer (DST): UTC+3 (EEST)

Kastmekoja is a village in Põlva Parish, Põlva County in southeastern Estonia.
