= Ruusa =

Village in Estonia

Coordinates: 58°03′N 27°18′E

- Village
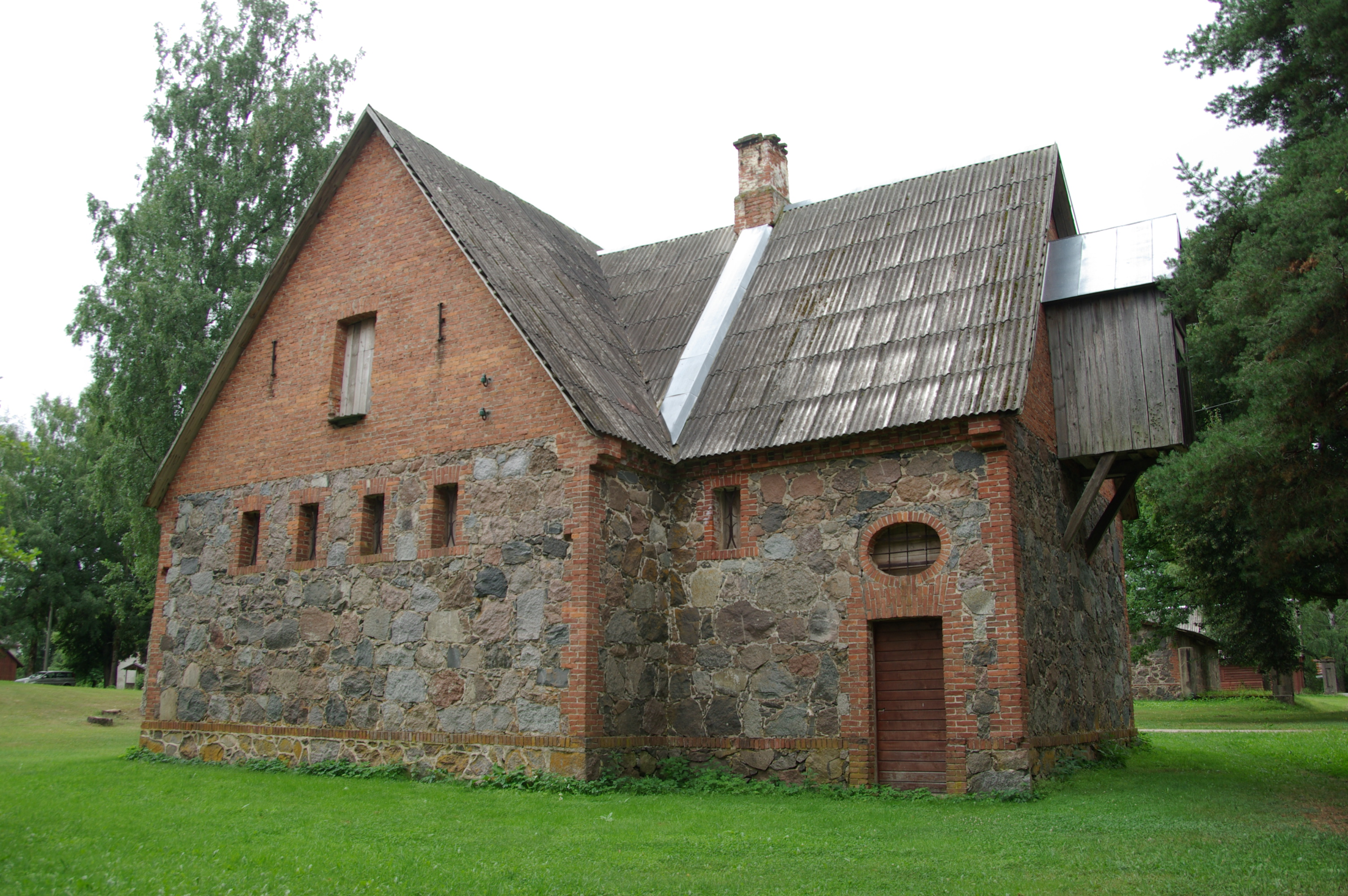
- Ruusa manor drying barn
- Interactive map of Ruusa
- Country: Estonia
- County: Põlva County
- Parish: Räpina Parish
- Time zone: UTC+2 (EET)
  - Summer (DST): UTC+3 (EEST)

Ruusa is a village in Räpina Parish, Põlva County in southeastern Estonia.

Preceding station	Elron	Following station
Holvandi towards Tallinn	Tallinn–Tartu–Koidula	Veriora towards Koidula
