= Kaaru =

Village in Estonia

Coordinates: 58°07′N 27°14′E

- Village
- Interactive map of Kaaru
- Country: Estonia
- County: Põlva County
- Parish: Põlva Parish
- Time zone: UTC+2 (EET)
  - Summer (DST): UTC+3 (EEST)

Kaaru is a village in Põlva Parish, Põlva County in southeastern Estonia.

Writer, journalist and artist Jaan Vahtra (1882–1947) was born in Kaaru.
