= Andre, Estonia =

Village in Estonia

Andre
- Village
- Location within Estonia
- Country: Estonia
- County: Põlva County
- Parish: Põlva Parish
- Time zone: UTC+2 (EET)
  - Summer (DST): UTC+3 (EEST)

Andre is a village in Põlva Parish, Põlva County in southeastern Estonia. It is known for its farms, most notably its dairy farms.
