= Puuri =

Village in Estonia

Coordinates: 58°03′N 27°01′E

- Village
- Interactive map of Puuri
- Country: Estonia
- County: Põlva County
- Parish: Põlva Parish
- Time zone: UTC+2 (EET)
  - Summer (DST): UTC+3 (EEST)

Puuri (German: Schwarzenhof) is a village in Põlva Parish, Põlva County in southeastern Estonia.
