= Partsi, Põlva County =

Village in Estonia

Coordinates: 58°00′48″N 27°10′22″E

Partsi
- Village
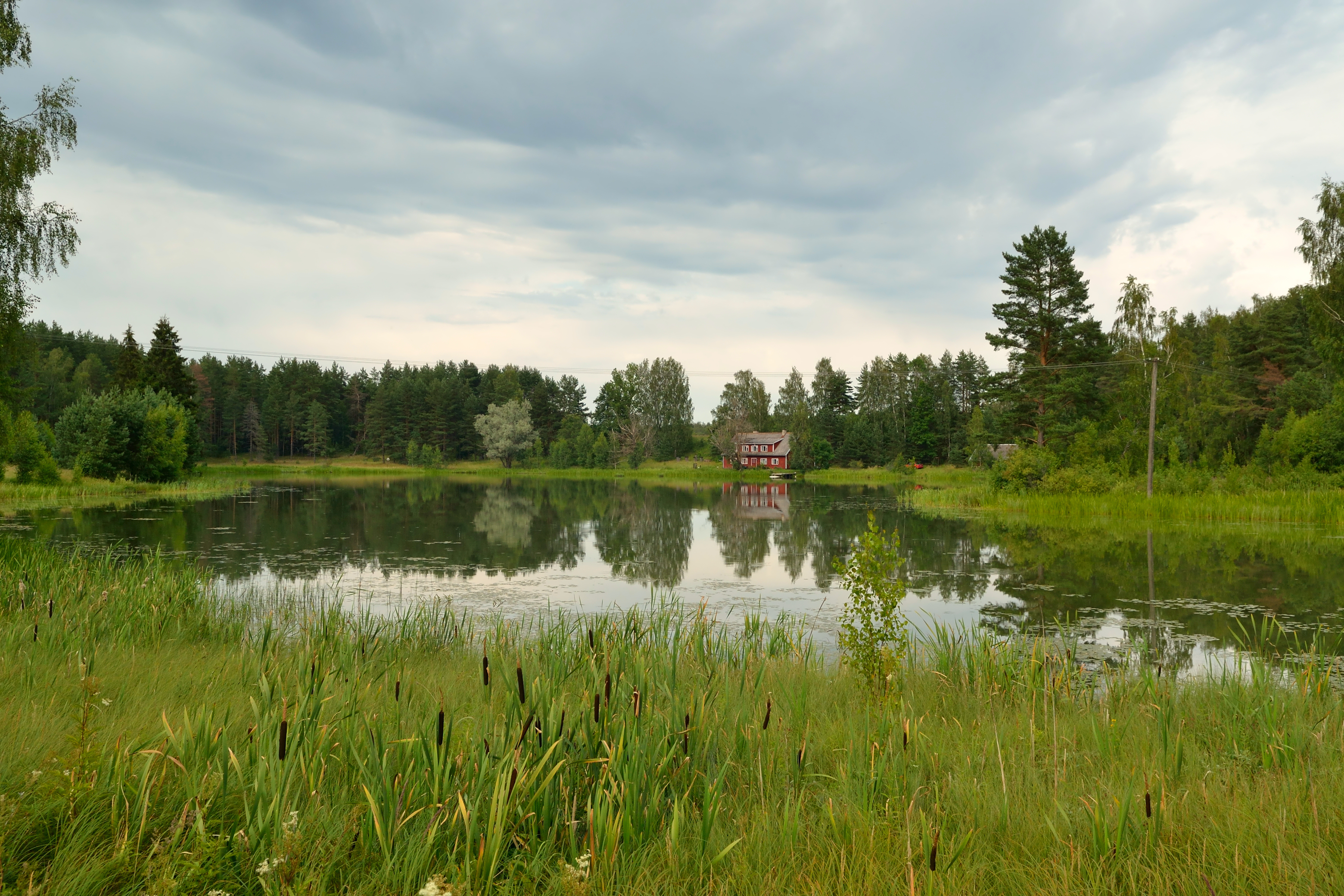
- View from Kõrdsijärv, a lake in Partsi
- Interactive map of Partsi
- Country: Estonia
- County: Põlva County
- Parish: Põlva Parish
- Time zone: UTC+2 (EET)
  - Summer (DST): UTC+3 (EEST)

Partsi (German: Parzimois) is a village in Põlva Parish, Põlva County in southeastern Estonia.
