= Valgesoo =

Village in Estonia

Coordinates: 58°08′44″N 27°04′17″E

- Village
- Interactive map of Valgesoo
- Country: Estonia
- County: Põlva County
- Parish: Põlva Parish
- Time zone: UTC+2 (EET)
  - Summer (DST): UTC+3 (EEST)

Valgesoo is a village in Põlva Parish, Põlva County in southeastern Estonia.

It is close to Valgesoo bog, which is classified as a Landscape Protection Area.
