= Miiaste =

Village in Estonia

Coordinates: 58°05′N 27°10′E

- Village
- Interactive map of Miiaste
- Country: Estonia
- County: Põlva County
- Parish: Põlva Parish
- Time zone: UTC+2 (EET)
  - Summer (DST): UTC+3 (EEST)

Miiaste is a village in Põlva Parish, Põlva County in southeastern Estonia.
