= Kähri, Põlva County =

Village in Estonia

Coordinates: 58°00′53″N 26°58′46″E

Kähri
- Village
- Interactive map of Kähri
- Country: Estonia
- County: Põlva County
- Parish: Põlva Parish
- Time zone: UTC+2 (EET)
  - Summer (DST): UTC+3 (EEST)

Kähri (German: Heimadra) is a village in Põlva Parish, Põlva County in southeastern Estonia.
