= Holvandi =

Village in Estonia

Coordinates: 58°03′N 27°13′E

- Village
- Interactive map of Holvandi
- Country: Estonia
- County: Põlva County
- Parish: Põlva Parish
- Time zone: UTC+2 (EET)
  - Summer (DST): UTC+3 (EEST)

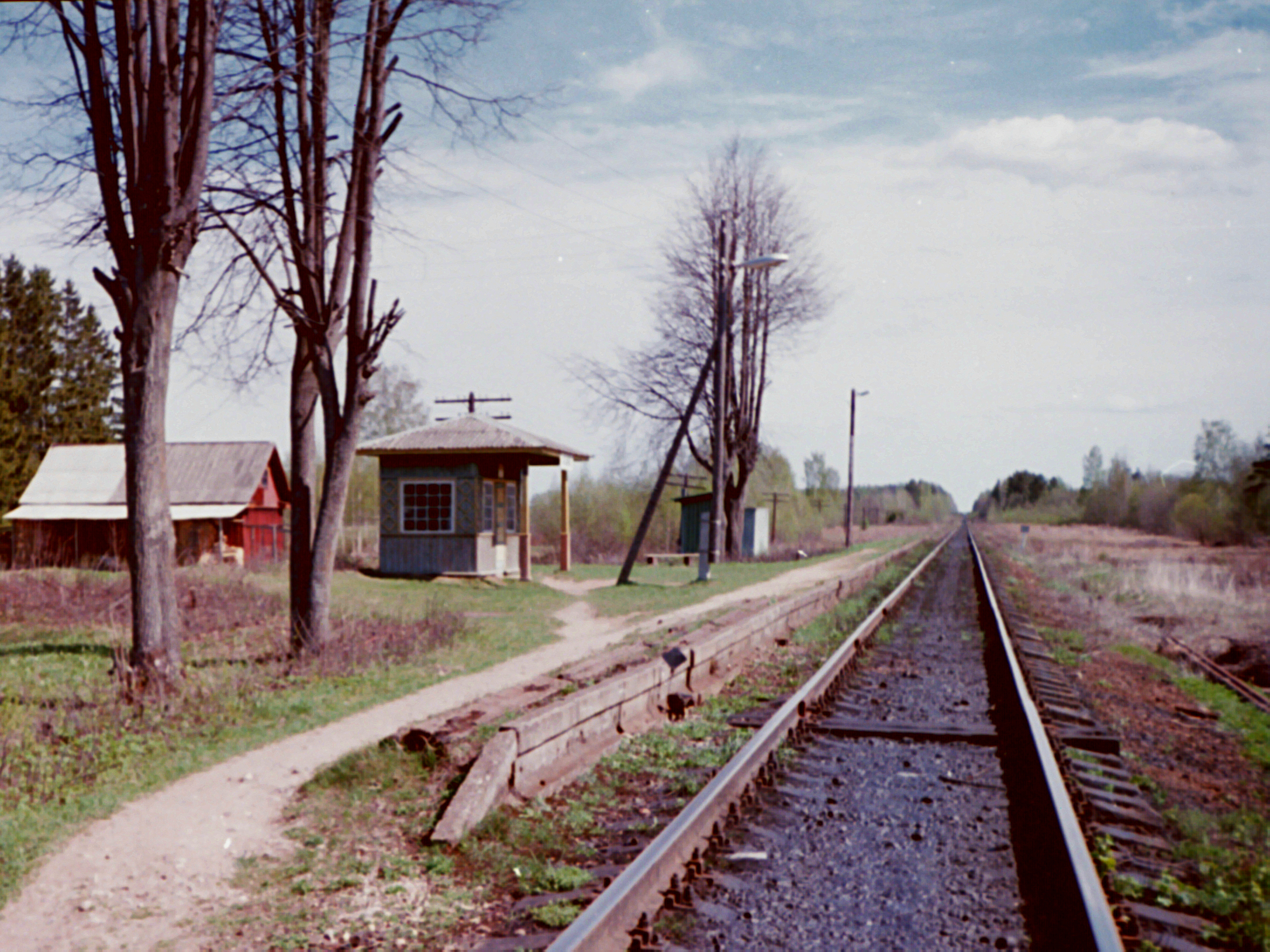
Holvandi railway station

Holvandi is a village in Põlva Parish, Põlva County in southeastern Estonia.

Preceding station	Elron	Following station
Põlva towards Tallinn	Tallinn–Tartu–Koidula	Ruusa towards Koidula
