= Leevijõe =

Village in Estonia

Coordinates: 58°09′N 26°55′E

- Village
- Interactive map of Leevijõe
- Country: Estonia
- County: Põlva County
- Parish: Põlva Parish
- Time zone: UTC+2 (EET)
  - Summer (DST): UTC+3 (EEST)

Leevijõe is a village in Põlva Parish, Põlva County in southeastern Estonia.

Part of a village is known as Popsiküla and formerly it was a standalone village.
