= Vastse-Kuuste =

Borough in Estonia

- Location within Estonia
- Coordinates: 58°10′4″N 26°55′43″E
- Country: Estonia
- County: Põlva County
- Parish: Põlva Parish
- Time zone: UTC+2 (EET)

Vastse-Kuuste is a small borough (alevik) in Põlva Parish, Põlva County in southeastern Estonia. Before the administrative reform in 2017, Vastse-Kuuste was the administrative centre of Vastse-Kuuste Parish.

Preceding station	Elron	Following station
Rebase towards Tallinn	Tallinn–Tartu–Koidula	Valgemetsa towards Koidula
