= Kosova, Estonia =

Village in Estonia

Kosova
- Village
- Interactive map of Kosova
- Country: Estonia
- County: Põlva County
- Parish: Põlva Parish
- Time zone: UTC+2 (EET)
  - Summer (DST): UTC+3 (EEST)

Kosova is a village in Põlva Parish, Põlva County, Estonia.
