= Mustajõe =

Village in Estonia

Coordinates: 57°58′12″N 26°57′31″E

- Village
- Interactive map of Mustajõe
- Country: Estonia
- County: Põlva County
- Parish: Põlva Parish
- Time zone: UTC+2 (EET)
  - Summer (DST): UTC+3 (EEST)

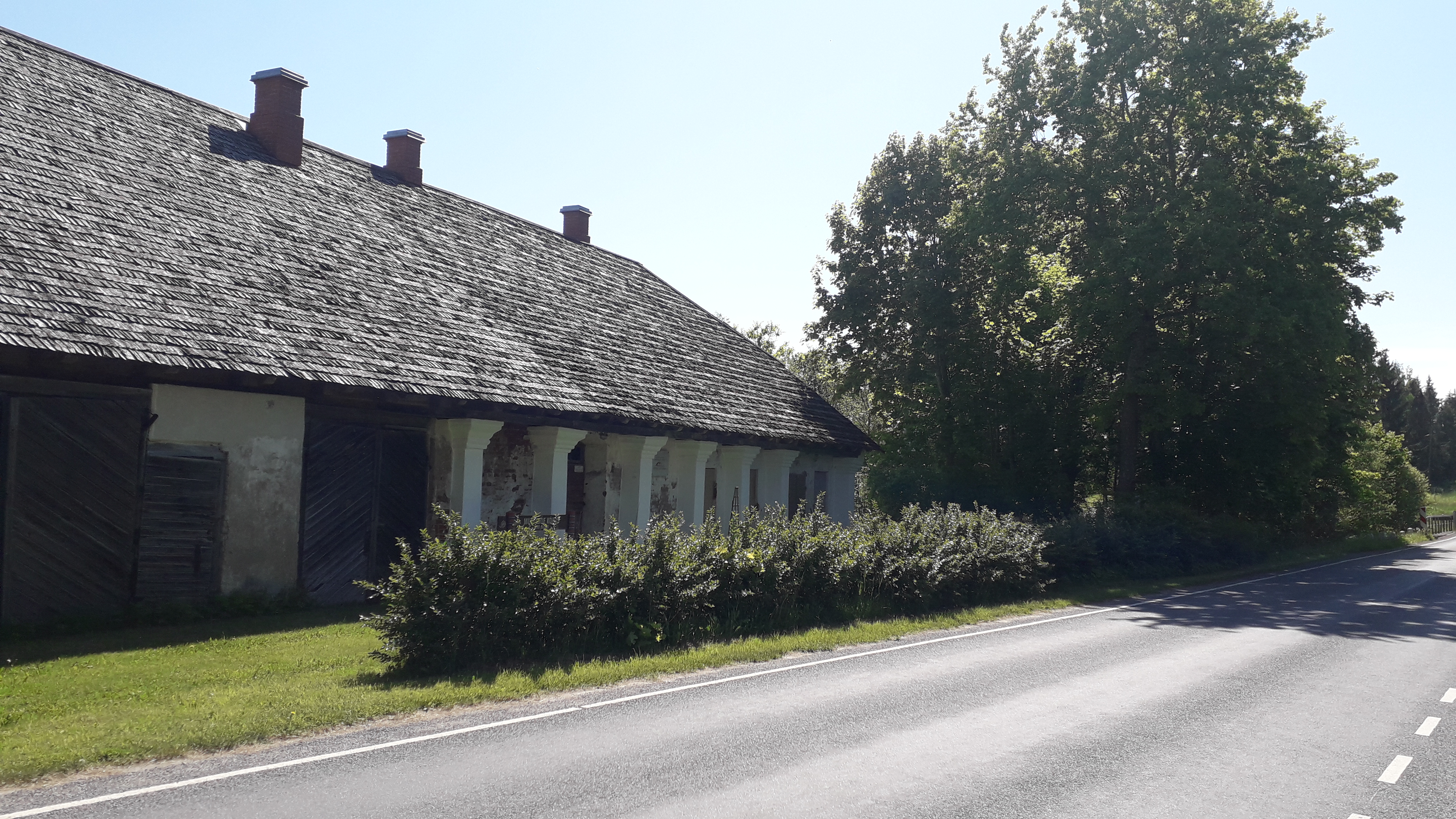
Mustajõe, Põlva parish

Mustajõe is a village in Põlva Parish, Põlva County in southeastern Estonia.
