= Orajõe, Põlva County =

Village in Estonia

Coordinates: 58°04′N 27°04′E

Orajõe
- Village
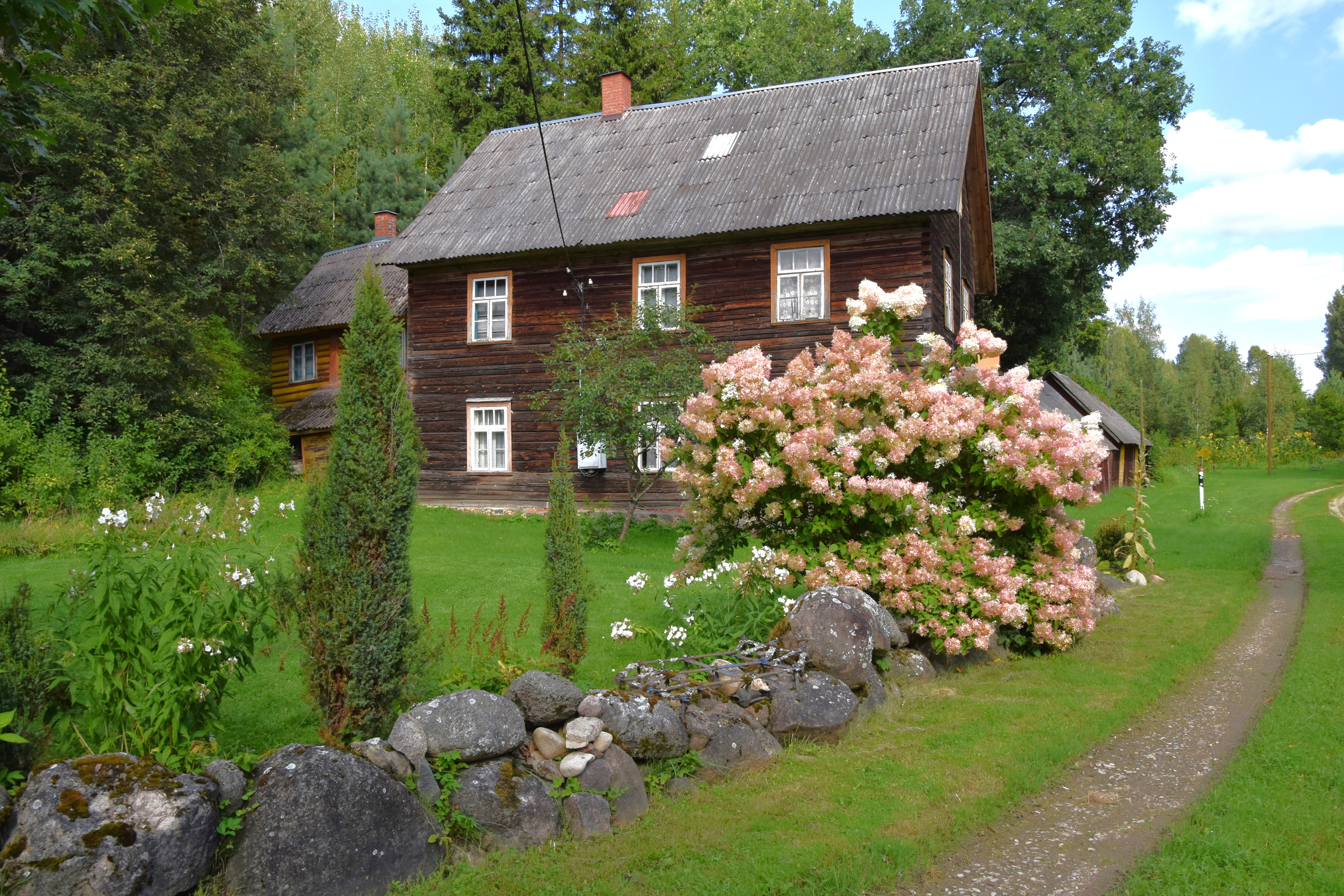
- A house in Orajõe
- Interactive map of Orajõe
- Country: Estonia
- County: Põlva County
- Parish: Põlva Parish
- Time zone: UTC+2 (EET)
  - Summer (DST): UTC+3 (EEST)

Orajõe is a village in Põlva Parish, Põlva County in southeastern Estonia.
