= Karilatsi, Põlva Parish =

Village in Estonia

Karilatsi
- Village
- Location in Estonia
- Coordinates: 58°08′21″N 26°54′46″E
- Country: Estonia
- County: Põlva County
- Municipality: Põlva Parish

Population (2011 Census)
  - Total: 113

Karilatsi is a village in Põlva Parish, Põlva County in southeastern Estonia. It is located about 11 km (7 mi) northwest of the town of Põlva and about 28 km (17 mi) southeast of the city of Tartu.

As of the 2011 census, the settlement's population was 113.
