= Valgemetsa =

Village in Estonia

Coordinates: 58°09′N 26°59′E

- Village
- Interactive map of Valgemetsa
- Country: Estonia
- County: Põlva County
- Parish: Põlva Parish
- Time zone: UTC+2 (EET)
  - Summer (DST): UTC+3 (EEST)

Valgemetsa is a village in Põlva Parish, Põlva County in southeastern Estonia.

It is located by the Ahja River near the Tartu-Petseri Railway.

The village was founded after the completion of the railway between 1927 and 1931.

In the 1930s Valgemetsa became a popular holiday location for artists and writers, notably Elmar Kits. Since then, other artists have spent time at the village, painting the landscape. These include, Saskia Kasemaa, Harri Pudersell and Ida Anton-Agu.

| Preceding station | Elron | Following station |
|---|---|---|
| Vastse-Kuuste towards Tallinn | Tallinn–Tartu–Koidula | Kiidjärve towards Koidula |
