= Joosu =

Village in Estonia

Coordinates: 57°56′N 27°03′E

- Village
- Interactive map of Joosu
- Country: Estonia
- County: Põlva County
- Parish: Põlva Parish
- Time zone: UTC+2 (EET)
  - Summer (DST): UTC+3 (EEST)

Joosu (German: Waimel-Neuhof) is a village in Põlva Parish, Põlva County in southeastern Estonia.

== Gallery ==
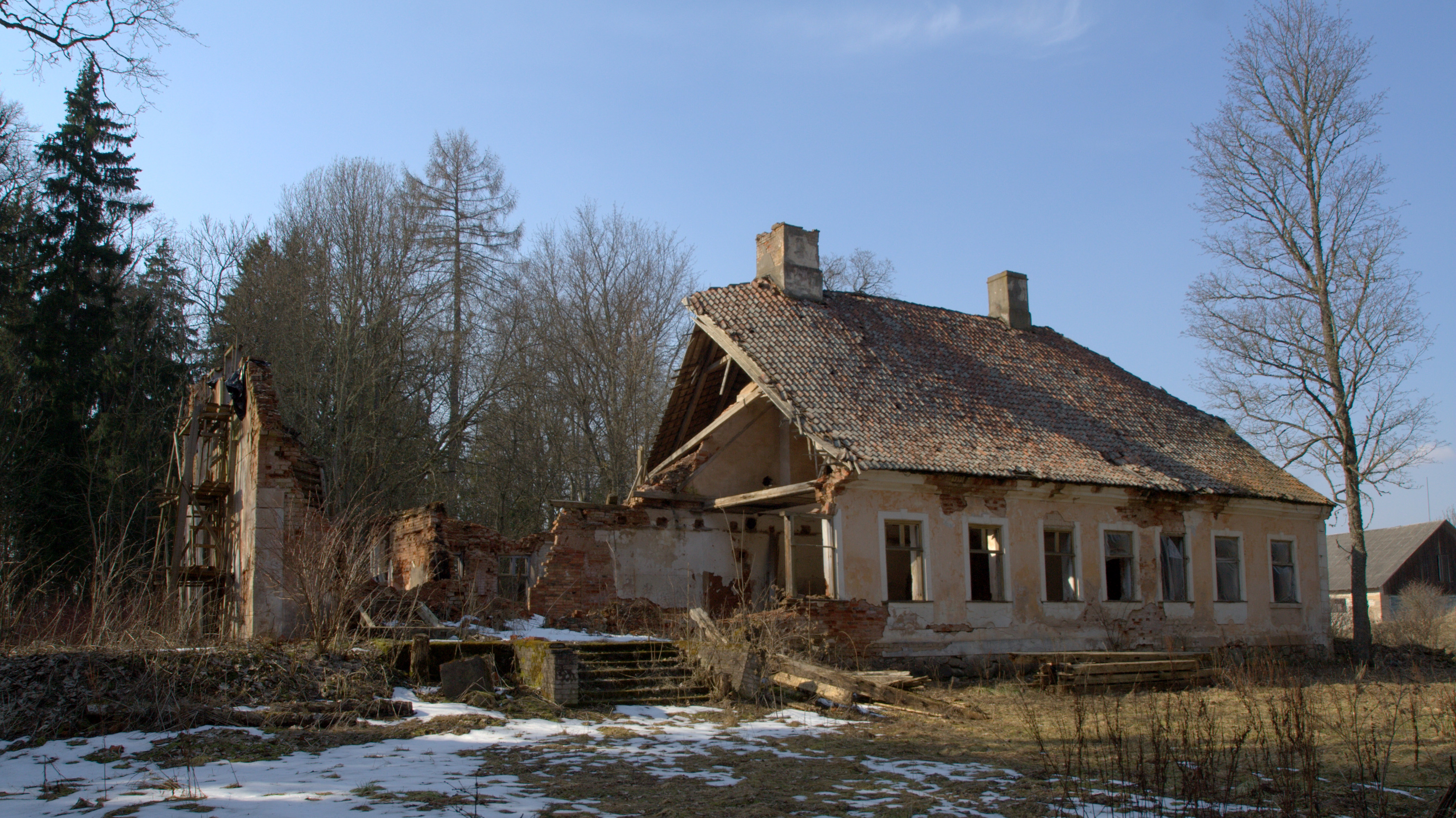
Ruins of Joosu manorhouse

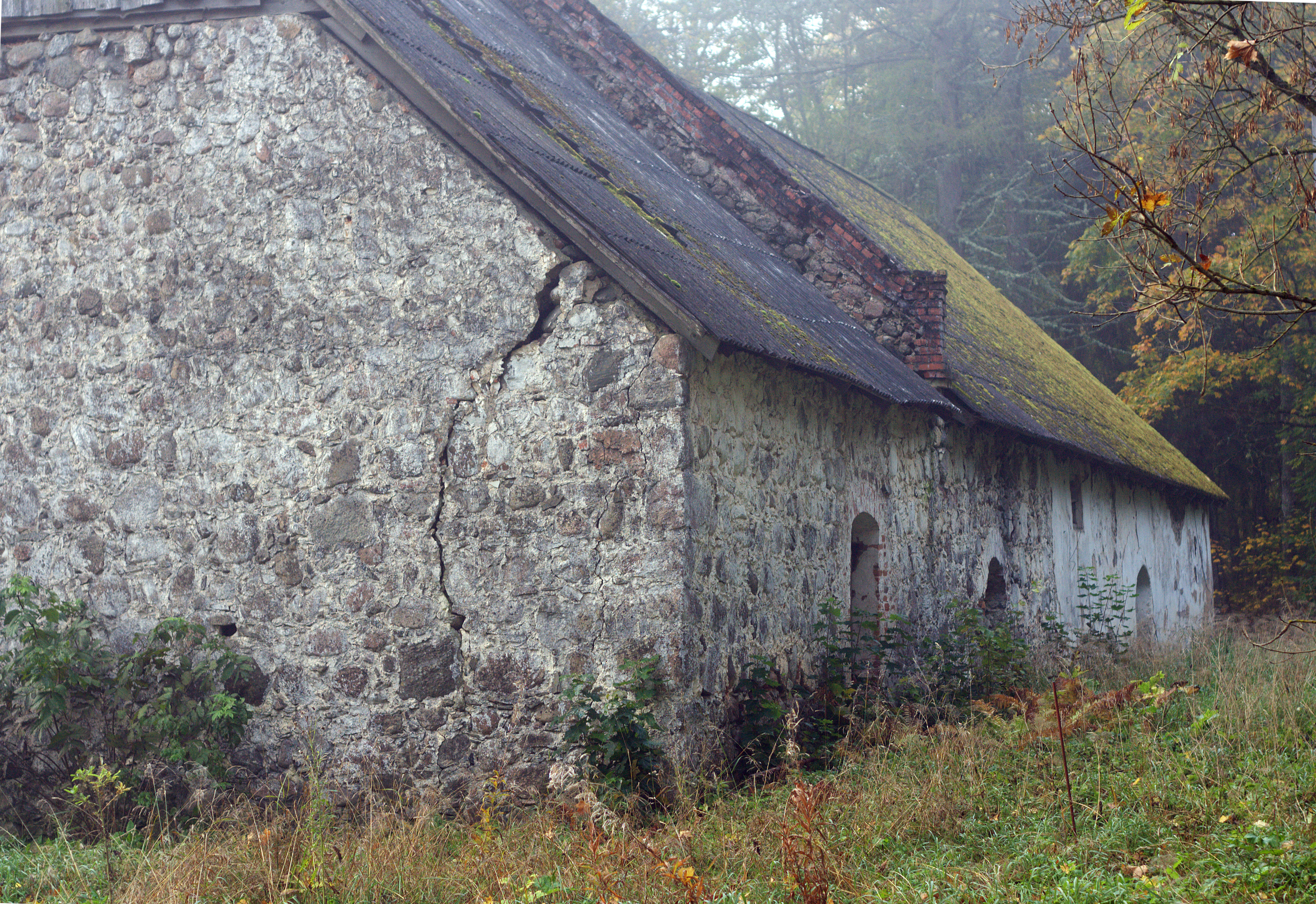
Barn of the manor

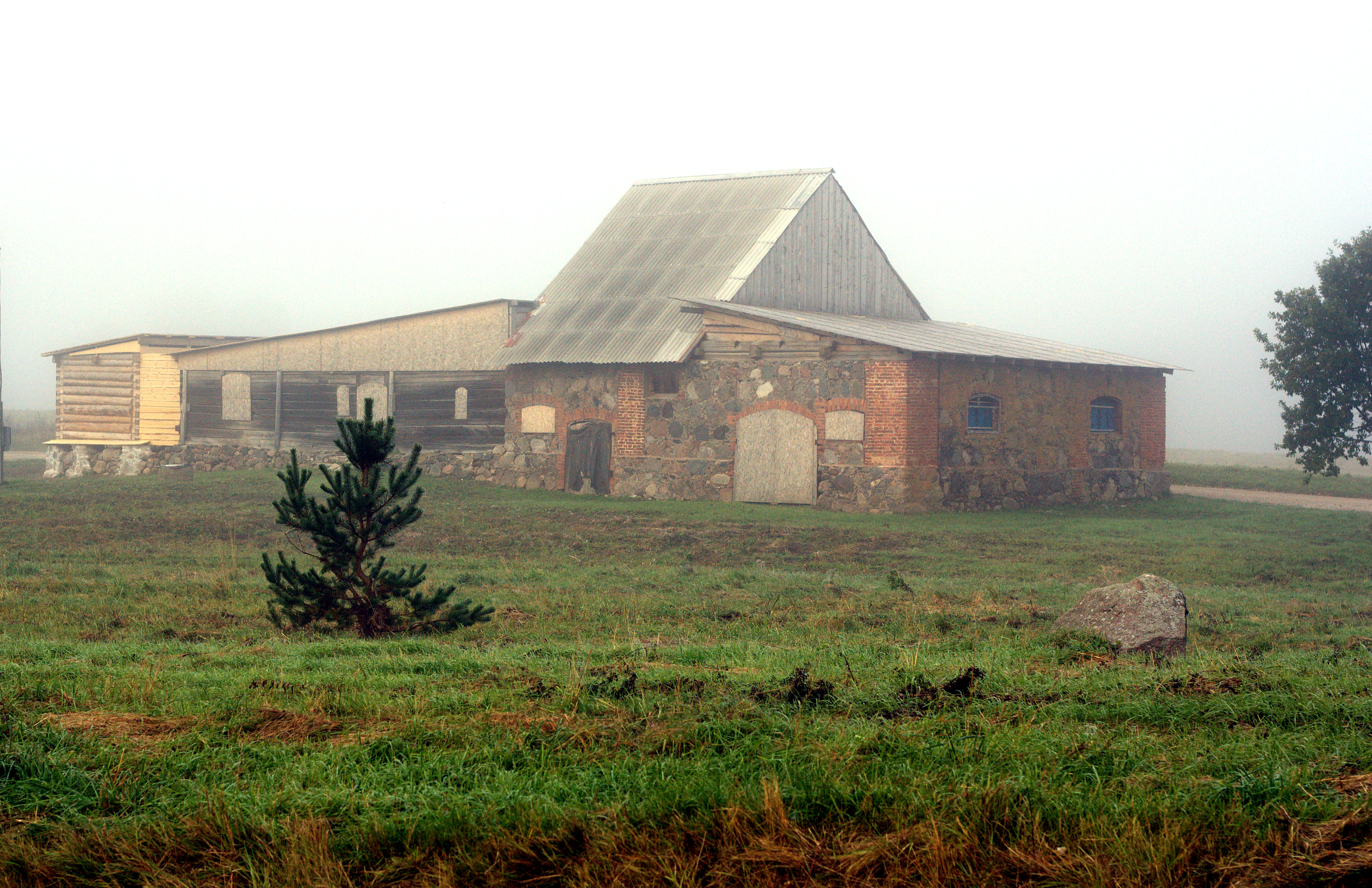
Former tavern of the manor
