= Kiisa, Põlva County =

Village in Estonia

Kiisa
- Village
- Location within Estonia
- Coordinates: 58.0625°N 27.2°E
- Country: Estonia
- County: Põlva County
- Parish: Põlva Parish
- Time zone: UTC+2 (EET)
  - Summer (DST): UTC+3 (EEST)

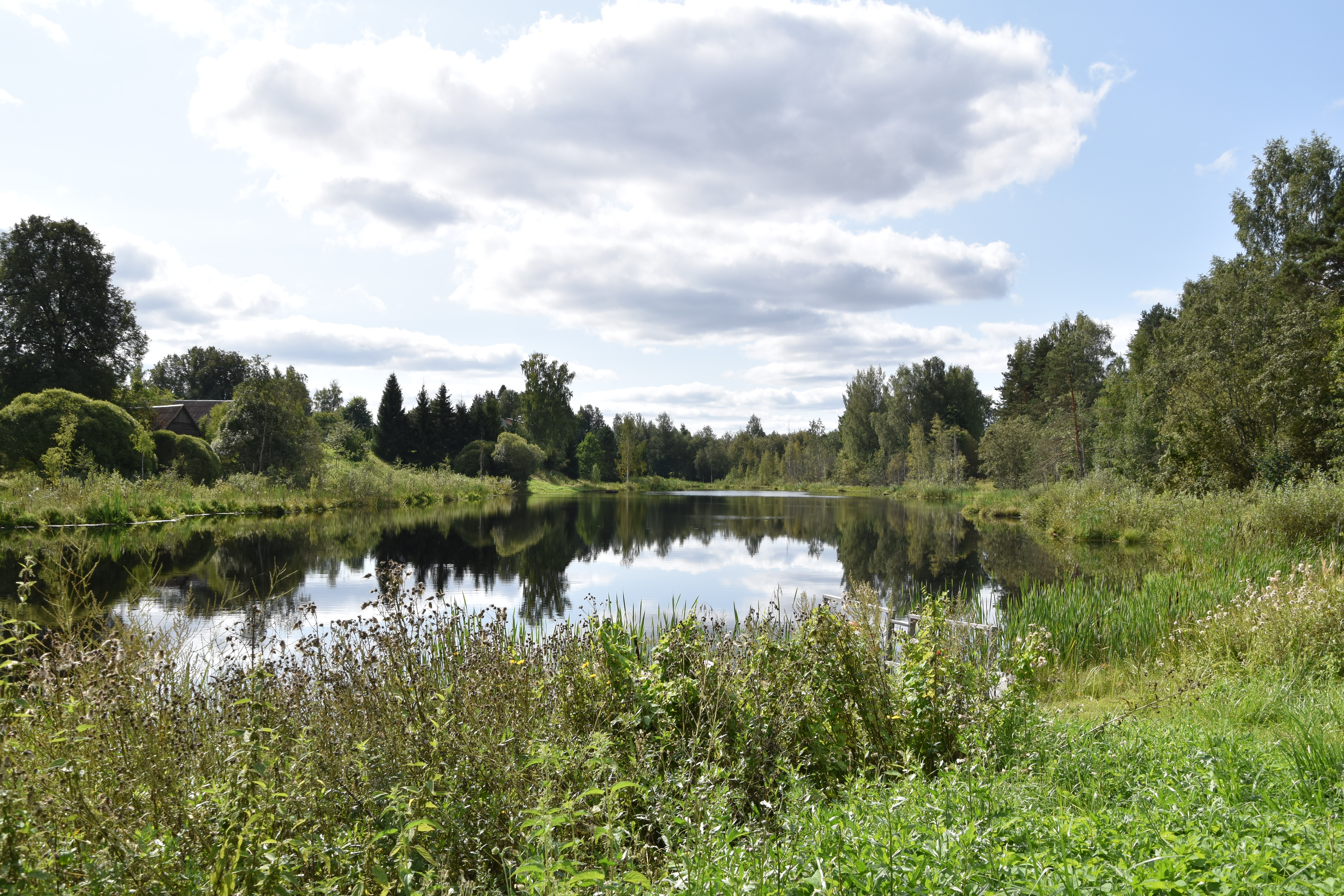
Kiisa

Kiisa is a village in Põlva Parish, Põlva County in Estonia.
