= Himma =

Village in Estonia

- Village
- Location within Estonia
- Coordinates: 57°59′N 27°4′E
- Country: Estonia
- County: Põlva County
- Parish: Põlva Parish
- Time zone: UTC+2 (EET)
  - Summer (DST): UTC+3 (EEST)

Himma is a village in Põlva Parish, Põlva County in southeastern Estonia.
