= Lutsu, Põlva County =

Village in Estonia

Coordinates: 58°02′43″N 27°09′35″E

Lutsu
- Village
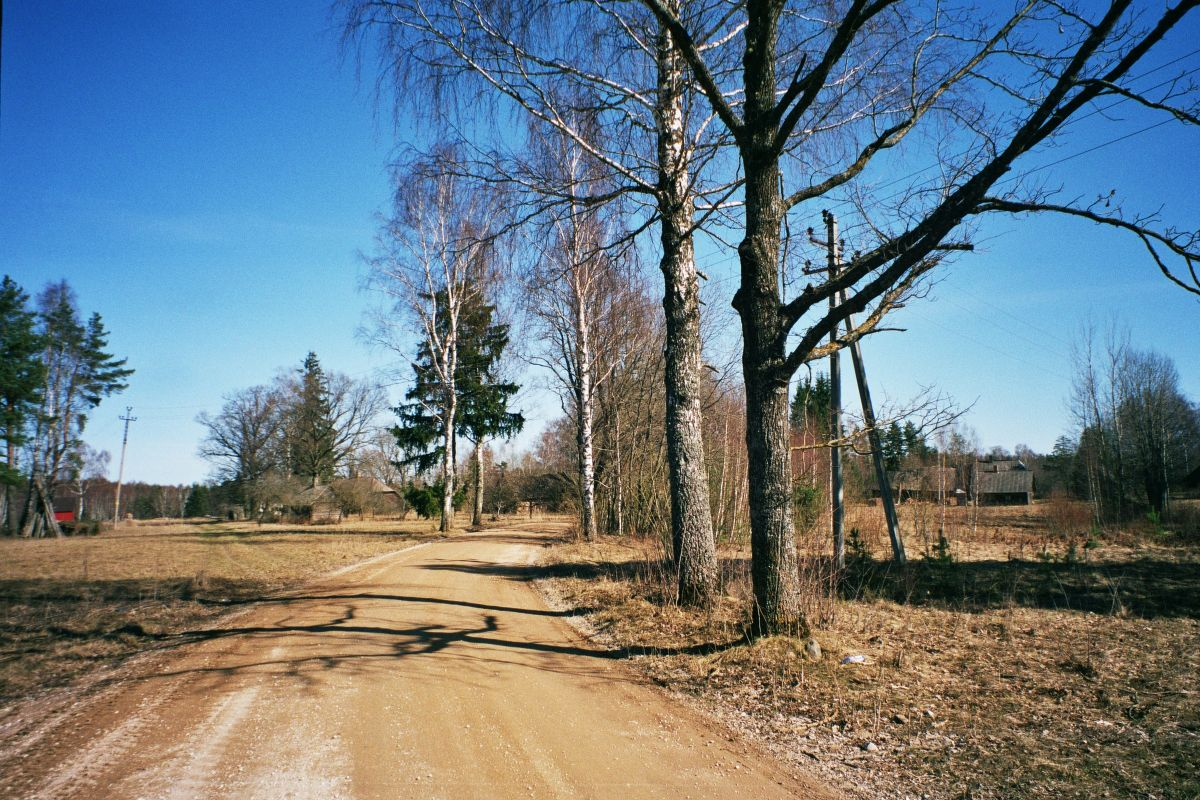
- Interactive map of Lutsu
- Country: Estonia
- County: Põlva County
- Parish: Põlva Parish
- Time zone: UTC+2 (EET)
  - Summer (DST): UTC+3 (EEST)

Lutsu is a village in Põlva Parish, Põlva County in southeastern Estonia.
