= Vanamõisa, Põlva County =

Village in Estonia

Coordinates: 58°13′02″N 27°06′25″E

Vanamõisa
- Village
- Interactive map of Vanamõisa
- Country: Estonia
- County: Põlva County
- Parish: Põlva Parish
- Time zone: UTC+2 (EET)
  - Summer (DST): UTC+3 (EEST)

Vanamõisa is a village in Põlva Parish, Põlva County in southeastern Estonia.
