= Kärsa, Põlva County =

Village in Estonia

Coordinates: 58°11′25″N 27°05′09″E

Kärsa
- Village
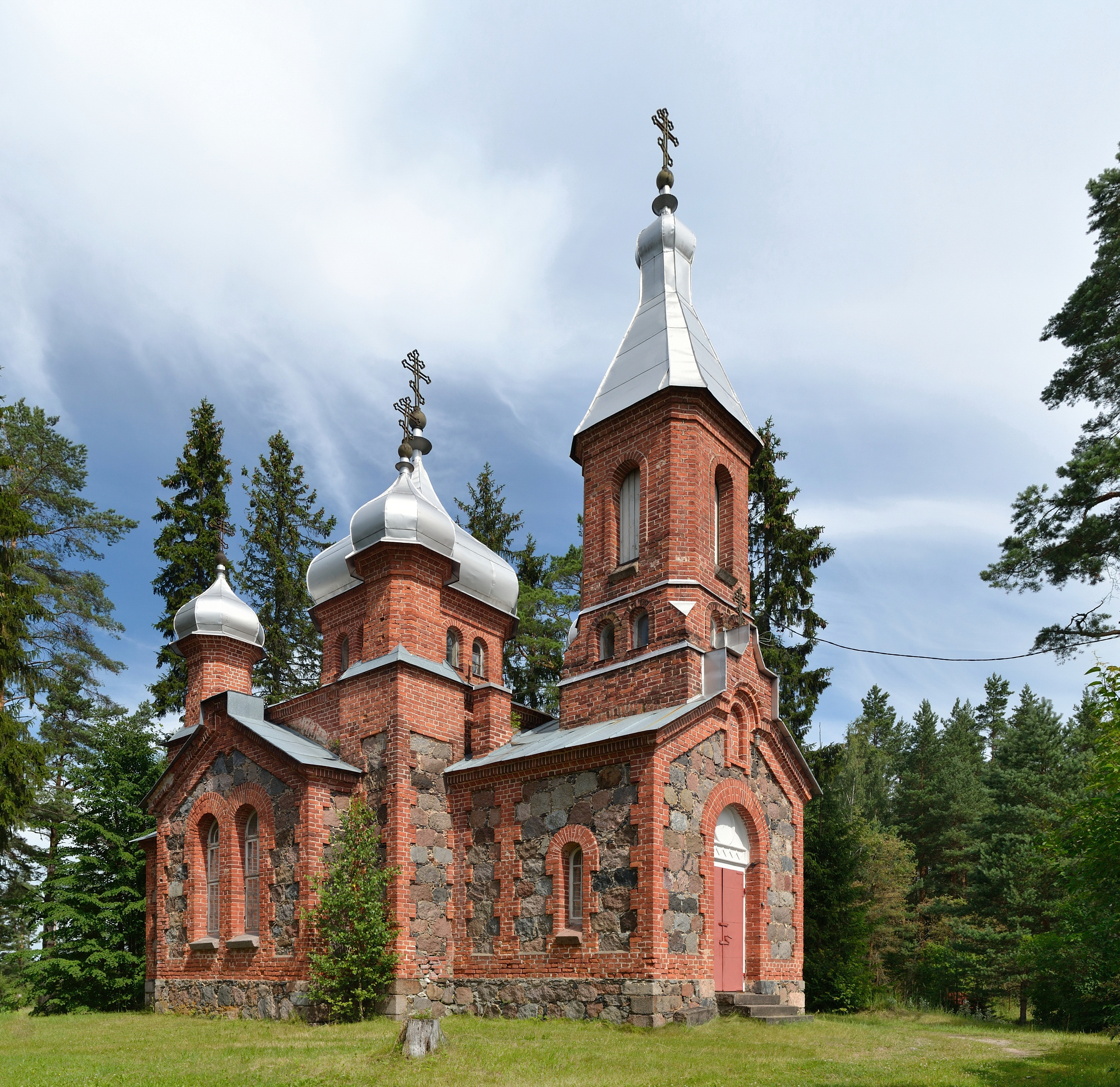
- Kärsa orthodox church
- Interactive map of Kärsa
- Country: Estonia
- County: Põlva County
- Parish: Põlva Parish
- Time zone: UTC+2 (EET)
  - Summer (DST): UTC+3 (EEST)

Kärsa is a village in Põlva Parish, Põlva County in southeastern Estonia.
