= Koorvere =

Village in Estonia

- Village
- Location in Estonia
- Coordinates: 58°07′26″N 26°57′36″E
- Country: Estonia
- County: Põlva County
- Municipality: Põlva Parish

Population (2011 Census)
  - Total: 41

Koorvere (also known as Kuurvere) is a village in Põlva Parish, Põlva County in southeastern Estonia. It is located about 9 km (6 mi) northwest of the town of Põlva and about 31 km (19 mi) southeast of the city of Tartu, on the crossing of the Põlva–Reola road (Tartu–Põlva, nr 61) and Ahja River.

As of the 2011 census, the settlement's population was 41.
