= Vana-Koiola =

Village in Estonia

Coordinates: 57°58′N 27°03′E

- Village
- Interactive map of Vana-Koiola
- Country: Estonia
- County: Põlva County
- Parish: Põlva Parish
- Time zone: UTC+2 (EET)
  - Summer (DST): UTC+3 (EEST)

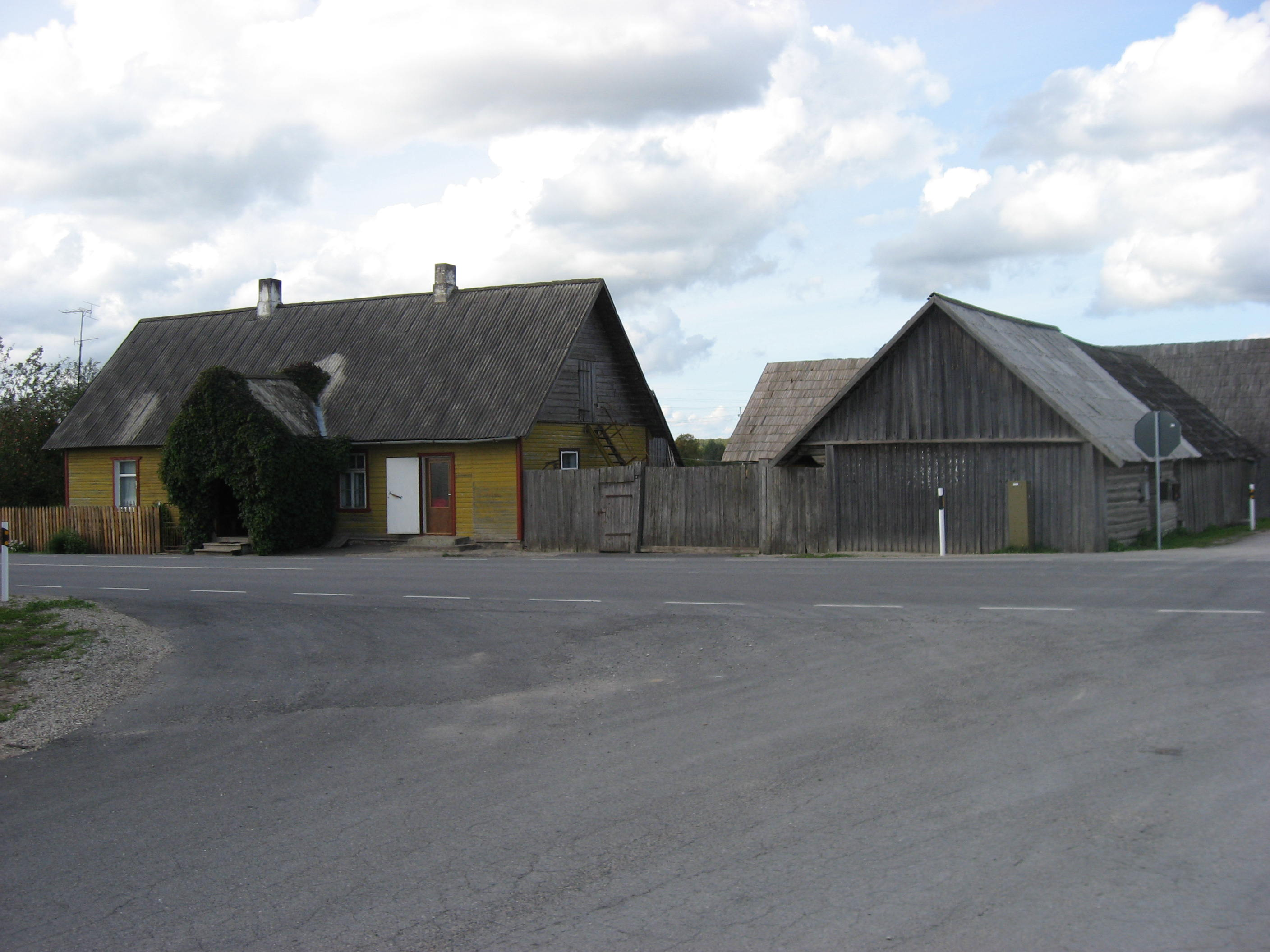
Vana-Koiola

Vana-Koiola (German: Alt-Koiküll-Kirrumpäh) is a village in Põlva Parish, Põlva County in southeastern Estonia.
