= Kalme =

Kalme may refer to:

Places in Estonia

- Kalme, Harju County, village in Kuusalu Parish, Harju County
- Kalme, Jõgeva County, village in Põltsamaa Parish, Jõgeva County
- Kalme, Tartu County, village in Elva Parish, Tartu County
- Kalme, Valga County, village in Tõrva Parish, Valga County

Other

- Charles Kalme (1939–2002), American chess player and mathematician
