= Kopu =

Kopu can refer to:

- Kopu or Malara, a god in Oceania
- Kopu, New Zealand, in the Thames-Coromandel District

== See also ==
- Kõpu (disambiguation)
