= Pilu =

Pilu may refer to:

== People ==
- Pilu (poet), Punjabi poet
- Pilu Khan, Bangladeshi singer
- Pilu Momtaz, Bangladeshi singer

== Places ==
- Pilu, Arad, Romania
- Pilu, Estonia
- Pilu river, Myanmar

== Other ==
- Pilu (raga), Hindustani music
- Pilu oil
- Pīlu
- Pilu (TV series), an Indian television series
