= Kõpu (disambiguation) =

Kõpu may refer to several places in Estonia:

- Kõpu, small borough in Põhja-Sakala Parish
  - Kõpu Parish, former municipality in Viljandi County
- Kõpu, Hiiu County, village in Hiiumaa Parish, Hiiu County
  - Kõpu Lighthouse
- Kõpu, Jõgeva County, village in Põltsamaa Parish, Jõgeva County
- Kõpu, Pärnu County, village in Pärnu, Pärnu County

== See also ==
- Kopu (disambiguation)
