= Nurga =

Village in Estonia

Coordinates: 58°44′N 26°03′E

- Village
- Interactive map of Nurga
- Country: Estonia
- County: Jõgeva County
- Parish: Põltsamaa Parish
- Time zone: UTC+2 (EET)
  - Summer (DST): UTC+3 (EEST)

Nurga is a village in Põltsamaa Parish, Jõgeva County in eastern Estonia.

== Name ==
Nurga was attested in historical sources as Norka in 1583, Nurkaperre (referring to a farm; cf. pere 'farm') in 1638, and Nurka M. (referring to the manor; cf. mõis 'manor') in 1797. The name is derived from the common noun nurk (genitive: nurga) 'corner; remote place'.
