= Vitsjärve =

Village in Estonia

Coordinates: 58°39′N 25°49′E

- Village
- Interactive map of Vitsjärve
- Country: Estonia
- County: Jõgeva County
- Parish: Põltsamaa Parish
- Time zone: UTC+2 (EET)
  - Summer (DST): UTC+3 (EEST)

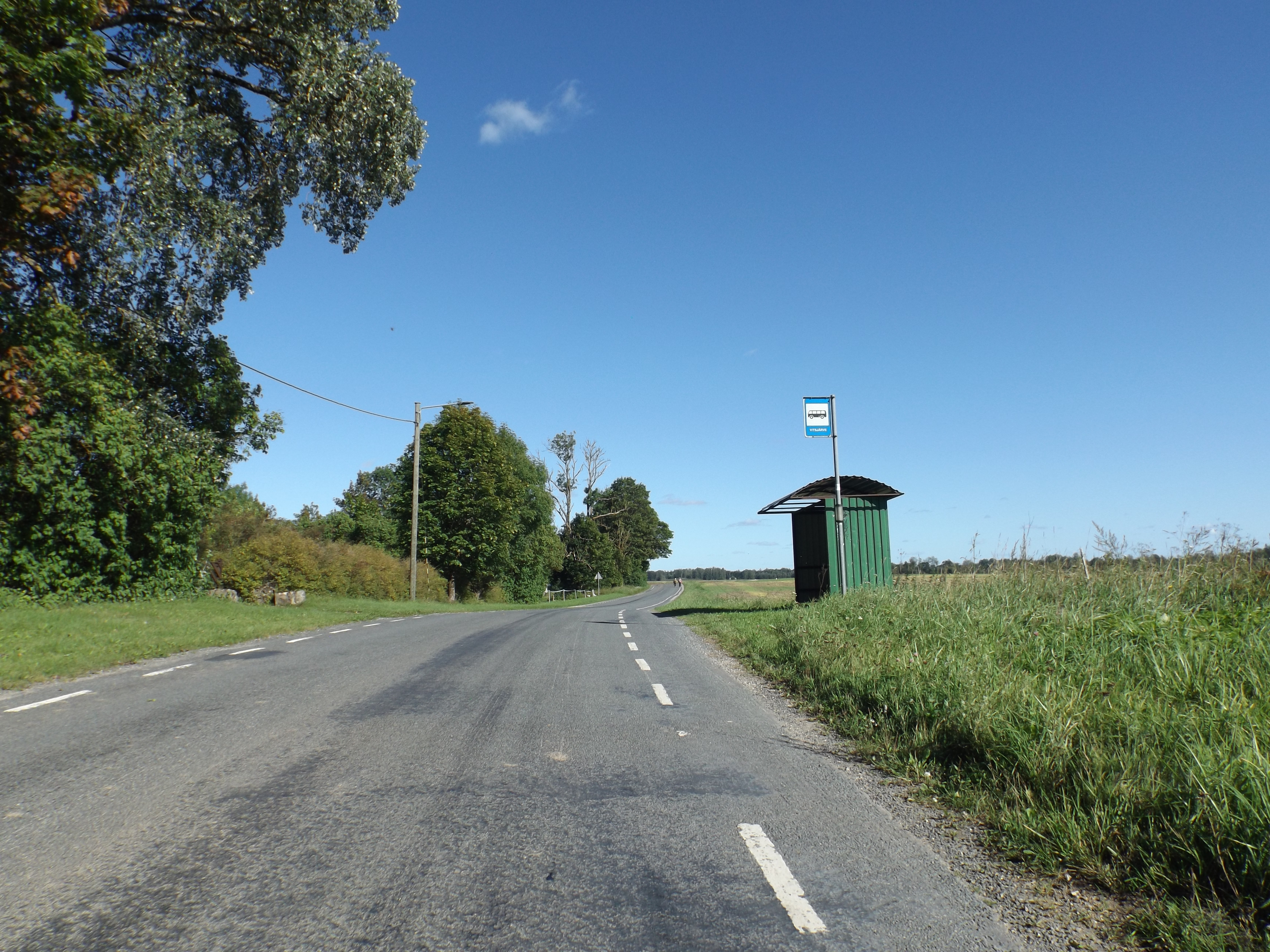
Bus stop in Vitsjärve

Vitsjärve is a village in Põltsamaa Parish, Jõgeva County in eastern Estonia.
