= Annikvere, Jõgeva County =

Village in Estonia

Coordinates: 58°38′41″N 26°02′07″E

Annikvere
- Village
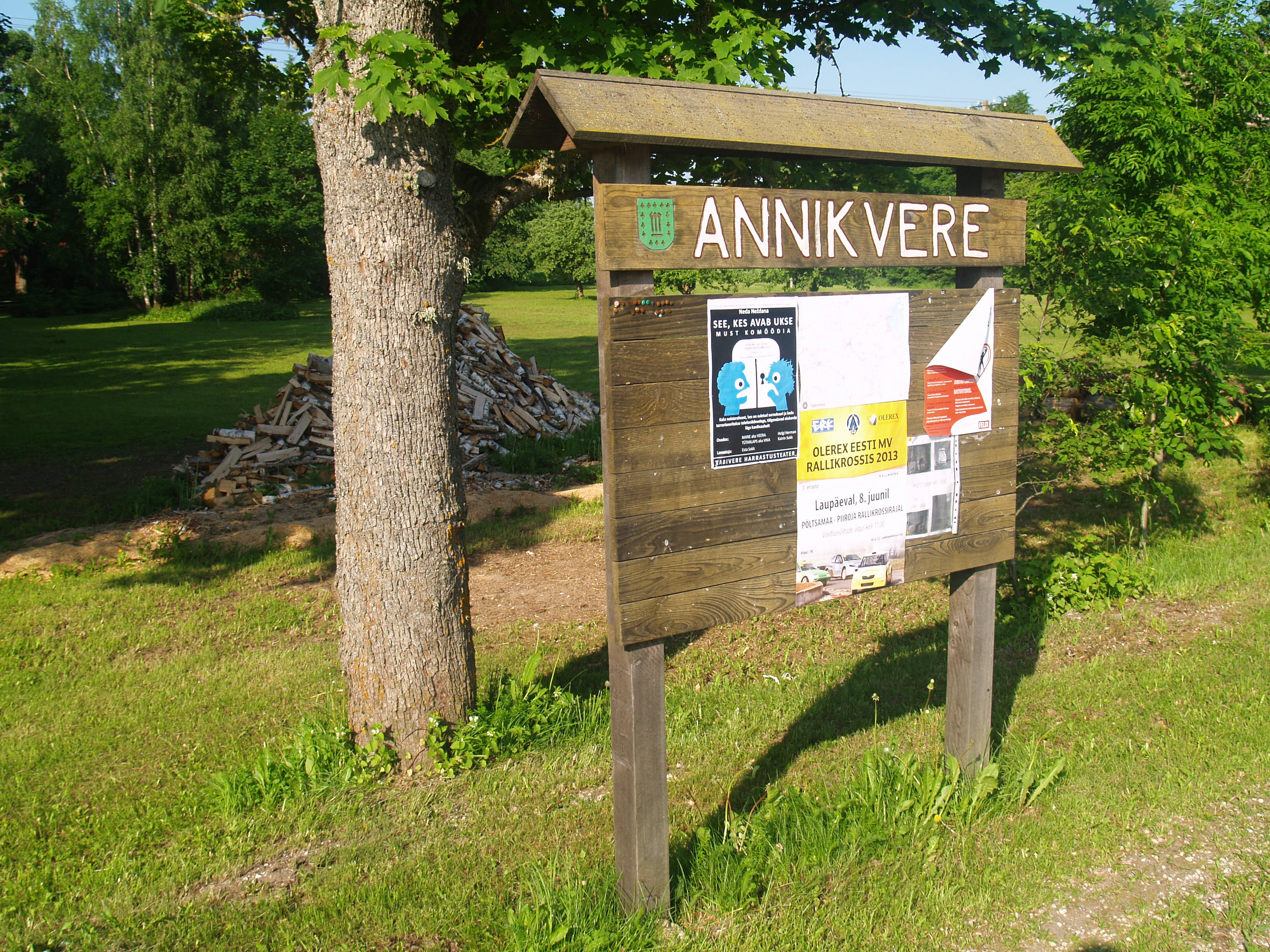
- Annikvere village information board
- Interactive map of Annikvere
- Country: Estonia
- County: Jõgeva County
- Parish: Põltsamaa Parish
- Time zone: UTC+2 (EET)
  - Summer (DST): UTC+3 (EEST)

Annikvere is a village in Põltsamaa Parish, Jõgeva County in eastern Estonia.
