= Loopre, Jõgeva County =

Village in Estonia

Coordinates: 58°42′47″N 25°59′30″E

Loopre
- Village
- Interactive map of Loopre
- Country: Estonia
- County: Jõgeva County
- Parish: Põltsamaa Parish
- Time zone: UTC+2 (EET)
  - Summer (DST): UTC+3 (EEST)

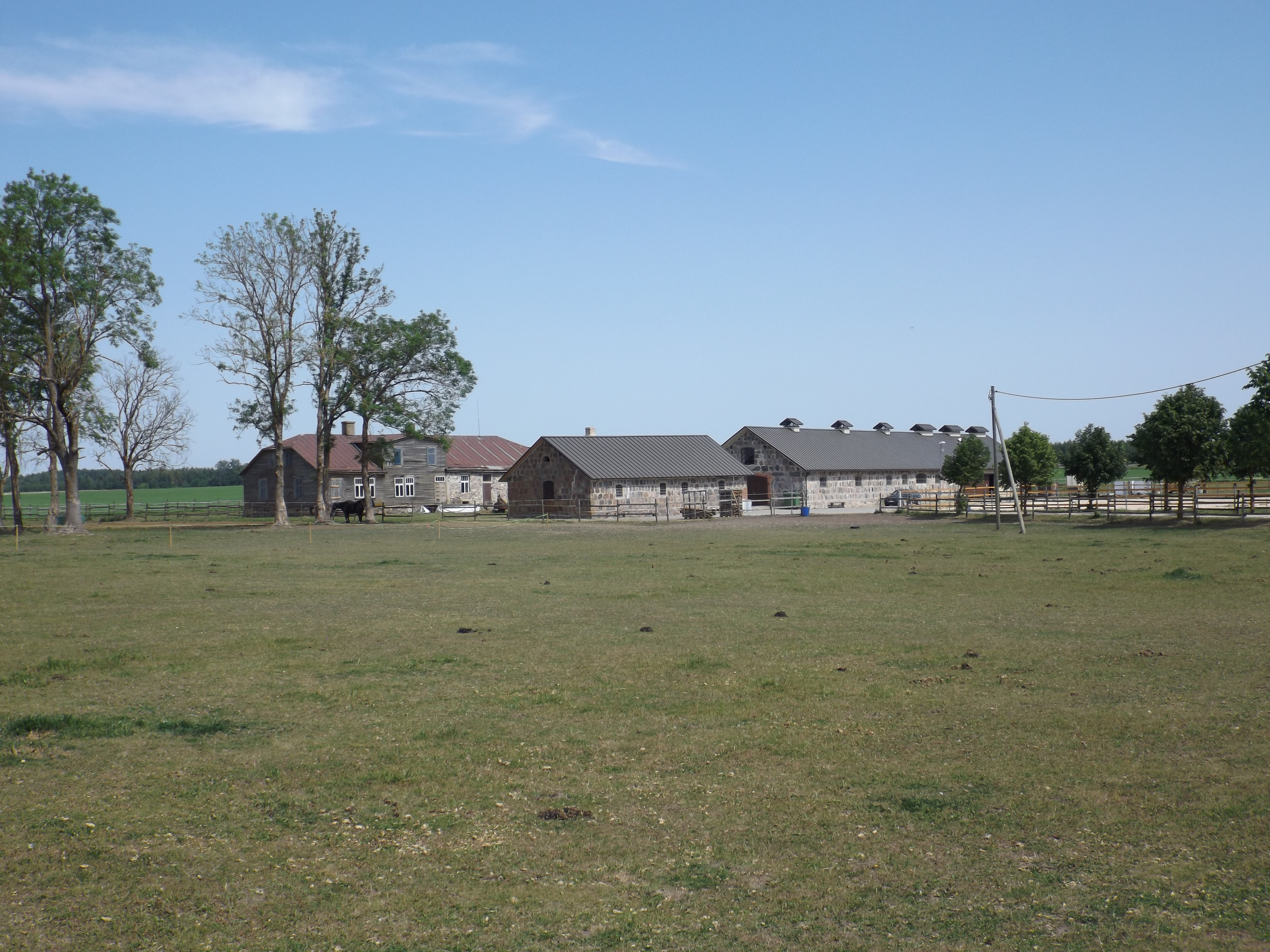
Loopre-Lepiku riding stables in Loopre village

Loopre is a village in Põltsamaa Parish, Jõgeva County in eastern Estonia.
