= Väike-Kamari =

Village in Estonia

- Location within Estonia
- Coordinates: 58°36′40″N 25°59′3″E
- Country: Estonia
- County: Jõgeva County
- Time zone: UTC+2 (EET)

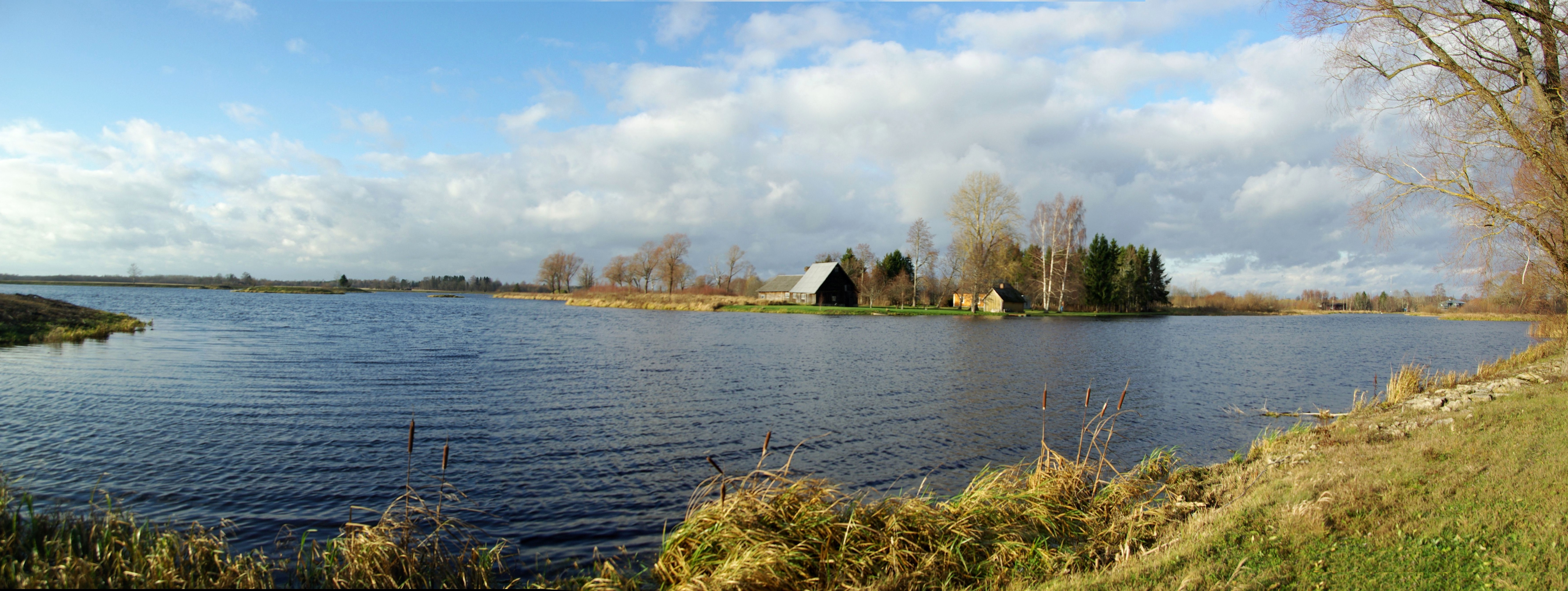
Kamari, Põltsamaa parish, Jõgeva county.

Väike-Kamari is a settlement in Põltsamaa Parish, Jõgeva County in central Estonia.
