= Põltsamaa Parish =

Municipality of Estonia (2017)

Coordinates: 58°27′0″N 26°10′0″E

Põltsamaa Parish Põltsamaa vald
- Municipality of Estonia
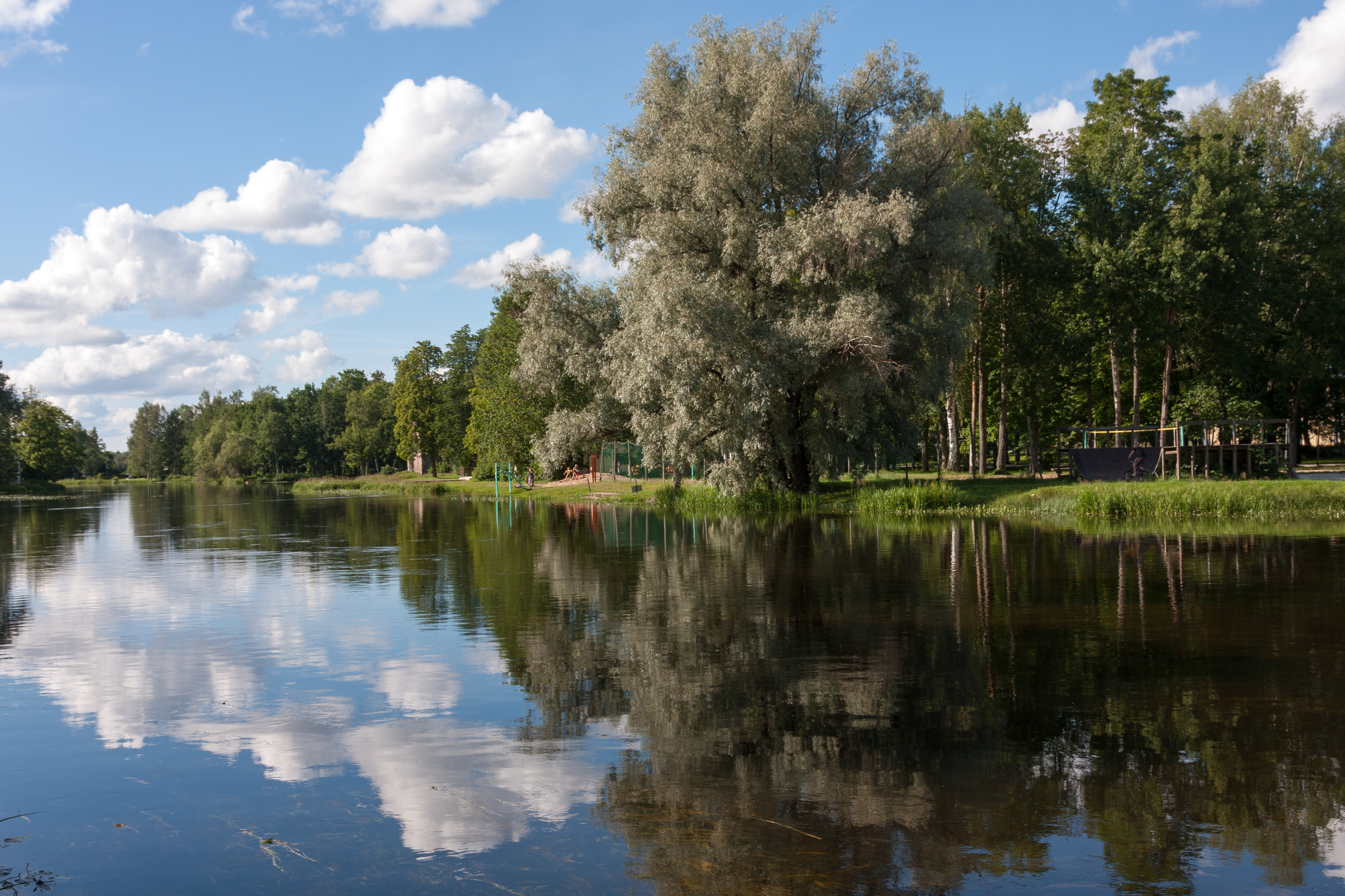
- Põltsamaa river

- Flag Coat of arms

- Põltsamaa Parish within Jõgeva County.
- Country: Estonia
- County: Jõgeva County
- Administrative centre: Põltsamaa

Area
  - Total: 889.56 km^{2} (343.46 sq mi)

Population (2019)
  - Total: 9,860
  - Density: 11.1/km^{2} (28.7/sq mi)
- ISO 3166 code: EE-618
- Website: www.poltsamaa.ee

Põltsamaa (Estonian: Põltsamaa vald) is a rural municipality of Estonia, in Jõgeva County. It has a population of 2722 (2001) and an area of 416.9 km^{2} (161.0 mi^{2}).

== Populated places ==
Põltsamaa Parish has one town, 3 small boroughs, and around 60 villages.

=== Towns ===
Põltsamaa

=== Small boroughs ===
Adavere - Kamari - Puurmani

=== Villages ===
Aidu - Alastvere - Altnurga - Annikvere - Arisvere - Esku - Jüriküla - Kaavere - Kablaküla - Kalana - Kaliküla - Kalme - Kauru - Kirikuvalla - Kõpu - Kõrkküla - Kose - Kuningamäe - Kuris - Laasme - Lahavere - Lebavere - Loopre - Luige - Lustivere - Mällikvere - Mõhküla - Mõisaküla - Mõrtsi - Neanurme - Nõmavere - Nurga - Pajusi - Pauastvere - Pikknurme - Pilu - Pisisaare - Pudivere - Puduküla - Puiatu - Räsna - Rõstla - Sopimetsa - Sulustvere - Tammiku - Tapiku - Tõivere - Tõrenurme - Tõrve - Umbusi - Uuevälja - Vägari - Väike-Kamari - Väljataguse - Vitsjärve - Võhmanõmme - Võisiku - Vorsti

== Religion ==
Religion in Põltsamaa Parish (2021)
1. Unaffiliated (81.8%)
2. Lutheran (13.9%)
3. Orthodox (1.80%)
4. Others Christians (0.80%)
5. Others Religions (1.70%)
6. 0.00%

== Notable people ==
- Friedrich Amelung (1842 in Võisiku – 1909), a Baltic German cultural historian, businessman and chess endgame composer.
- Karl August Hermann (1851 in Võhmanõmme – 1909), writer, publicist, linguist and composer.
- Mihkel Pung (1876 in Põltsamaa Parish – 1941), politician and a former Minister of Foreign Affairs
- Johannes-Friedrich Zimmermann (1882 in Sosva – 1942), politician, Ministry of Economic Affairs in 1929 to 1931 and in 1932.
- Karl Tõnisson (1883 in Umbusi – 1962), a writer and religious figure who engaged with Buddhism in Estonia
- Artur Tupits (1892 in Põltsamaa Parish – 1941), politician, Ministry of Regional Affairs and Agriculture in the 1930's
- Ants Paju (1944 in Tamsi – 2011), politician, journalist, athlete and engineer.
