= Altnurga =

Village in Estonia

- Village
- Location within Estonia
- Coordinates: 58.548888888889°N 26.301944444444°E
- Country: Estonia
- County: Jõgeva County
- Parish: Põltsamaa Parish
- Time zone: UTC+2 (EET)
  - Summer (DST): UTC+3 (EEST)

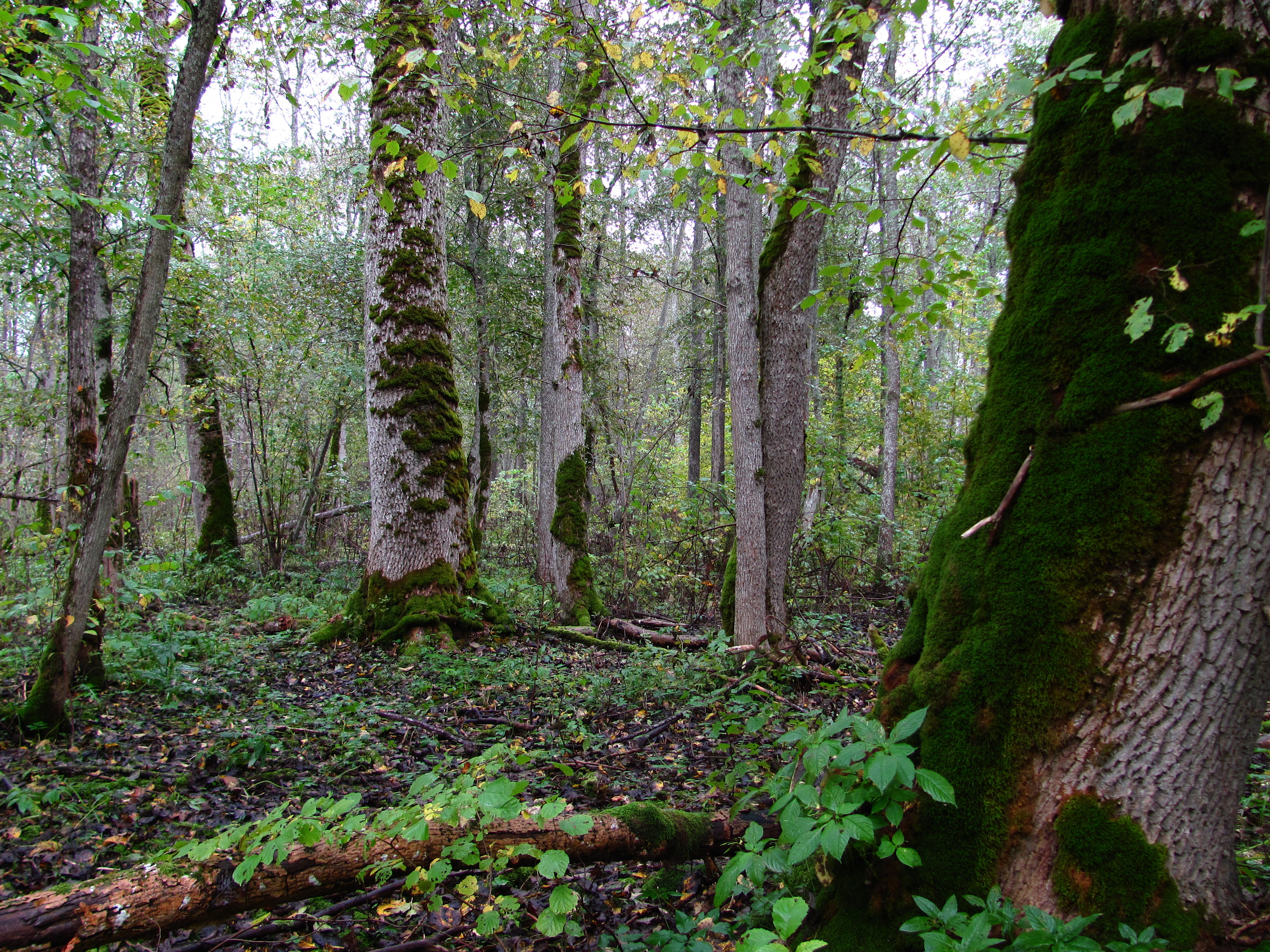
European Ash forest, Altnurga, Alam-Pedja Nature Reserve, Estonia

Altnurga is a village in Põltsamaa Parish, Jõgeva County in Estonia.

== Name ==
Altnurga was attested in historical sources as Altnurkast in 1752 and Alt-Nurkast in 1798 (both in the elative case), and as Альтнуркъ in 1900. The name is derived from the prefix alt '(from) below' plus the common noun nurk (genitive: nurga) 'corner; remote place', probably referring to its relative location as the southernmost village with scattered farms belonging to Puurmani manor.
