= Pikknurme =

Village in Estonia

- Village
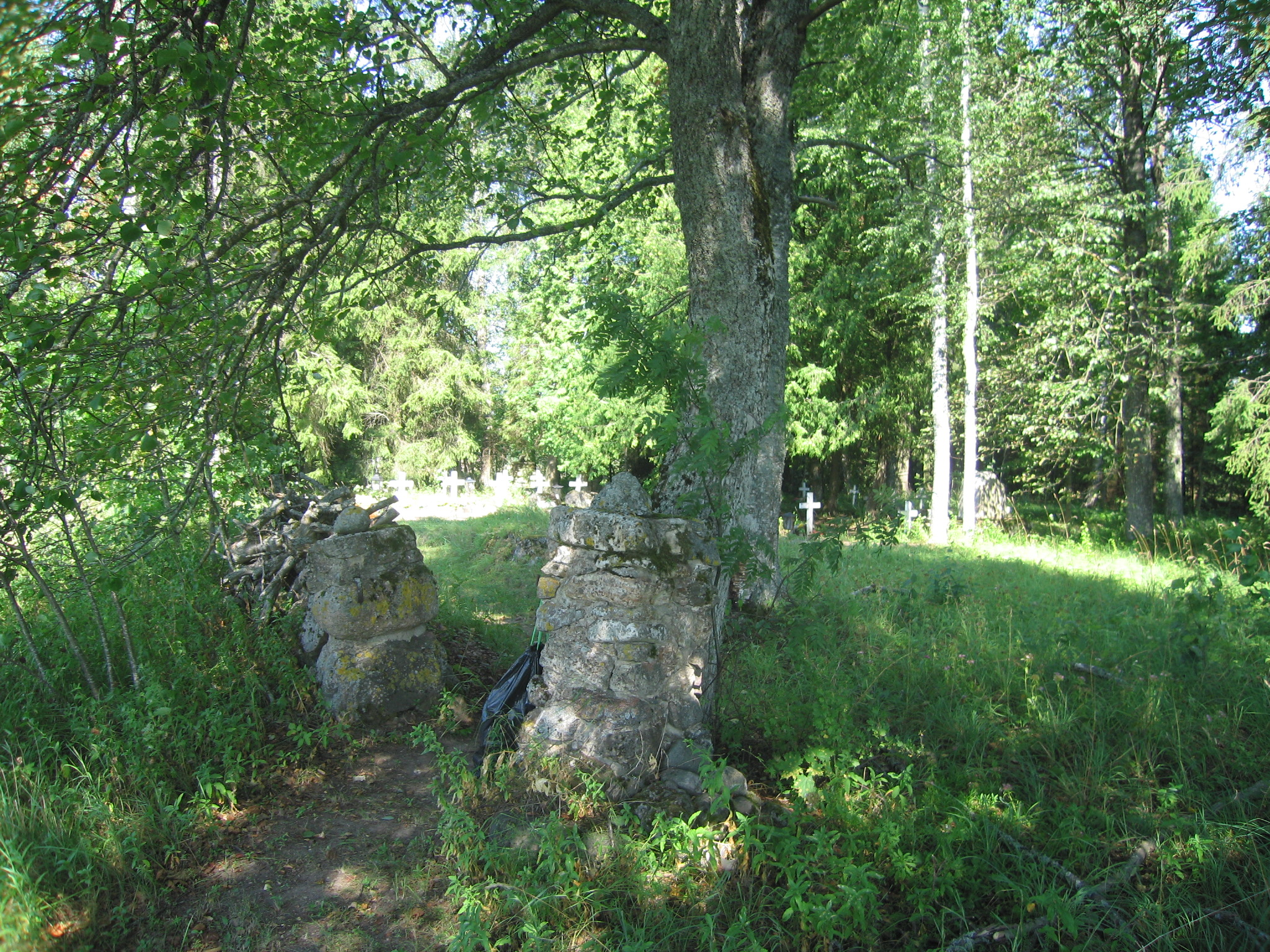
- Otti farm cemetery in Pikknurme

- Location in Estonia
- Coordinates: 58°36′10″N 26°12′43″E
- Country: Estonia
- County: Jõgeva County
- Municipality: Põltsamaa Parish

Population (10.04.2006)
  - Total: 203

Pikknurme is a village in Põltsamaa Parish, Jõgeva County in Estonia. It is located just northwest of Puurmani, by the Tallinn –Tartu road (E263). Pikknurme has a population of 203 (as of 10 April 2006). The village is crossed by the Pikknurme River.
