= Puiatu, Jõgeva County =

Village in Estonia

Coordinates: 58°44′N 25°53′E

Puiatu
- Village
- Interactive map of Puiatu
- Country: Estonia
- County: Jõgeva County
- Parish: Põltsamaa Parish
- Time zone: UTC+2 (EET)
  - Summer (DST): UTC+3 (EEST)

Puiatu is a village in Põltsamaa Parish, Jõgeva County in eastern Estonia.
