= Tõrenurme =

Village in Estonia

Coordinates: 58°38′N 26°09′E

- Village
- Interactive map of Tõrenurme
- Country: Estonia
- County: Jõgeva County
- Parish: Põltsamaa Parish
- Time zone: UTC+2 (EET)
  - Summer (DST): UTC+3 (EEST)

Tõrenurme is a village in Põltsamaa Parish, Jõgeva County in eastern Estonia.
