= Jüriküla =

Village in Estonia

- Village
- Location within Estonia
- Coordinates: 58°33′42″N 26°16′41″E
- Country: Estonia
- County: Jõgeva County
- Parish: Põltsamaa Parish
- Time zone: UTC+2 (EET)
  - Summer (DST): UTC+3 (EEST)

Jüriküla is a village in Põltsamaa Parish, Jõgeva County in Estonia.
