= Kablaküla =

Village in Estonia

Coordinates: 58°37′N 26°04′E

- Village
- Interactive map of Kablaküla
- Country: Estonia
- County: Jõgeva County
- Parish: Põltsamaa Parish
- Time zone: UTC+2 (EET)
  - Summer (DST): UTC+3 (EEST)

Bus stop in Kablaküla village, Põltsamaa Parish

Kablaküla is a village in Põltsamaa Parish, Jõgeva County in eastern Estonia.
