= Lustivere =

Village in Estonia

- Village
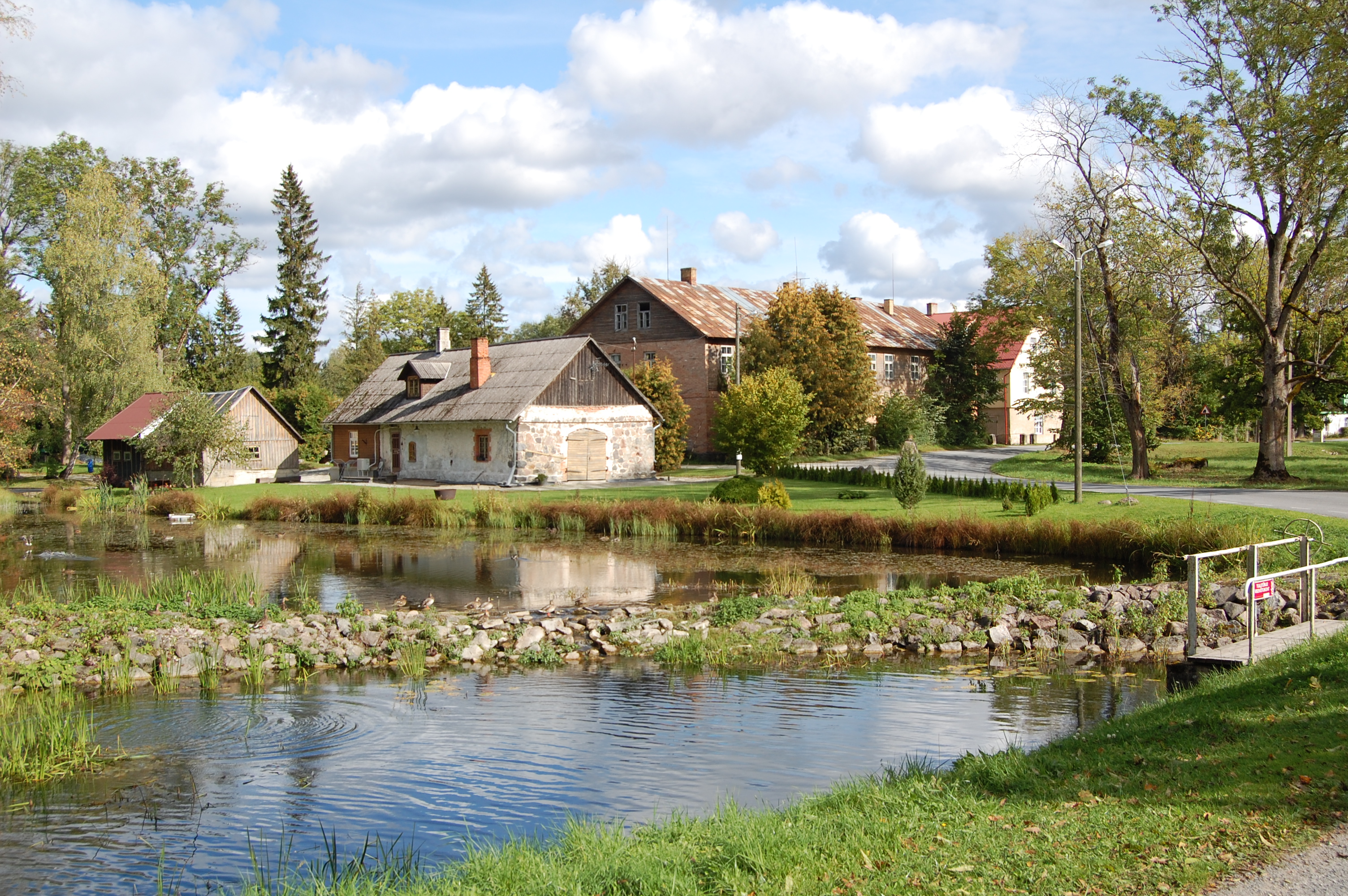
- Lustivere

- Location in Estonia
- Coordinates: 58°40′N 26°05′E
- Country: Estonia
- County: Jõgeva County
- Parish: Põltsamaa Parish

Population (2019)
  - Total: 359
- Time zone: UTC+2 (EET)
  - Summer (DST): UTC+3 (EEST)

Lustivere is a village in Põltsamaa Parish, Jõgeva County in eastern Estonia.

== Lustivere Manor ==
Lustivere Manor (German: Lustifer) has a history that goes back to at least 1522. During the centuries, it has belonged to the Baltic German aristocratic families von Wolff, von Samson-Himmelstjerna and von Wahl, among others. The current building dates from 1881, with the tower added in 1891. The architect was Reinhold Guleke from Tartu. A renovation was carried out already in 1910, when the building received such modern amenities as electricity and running water. Several of the furnishings from an earlier building were transferred to the new main house and are preserved, such as baroque doors and cocklestoves.

== Gallery ==
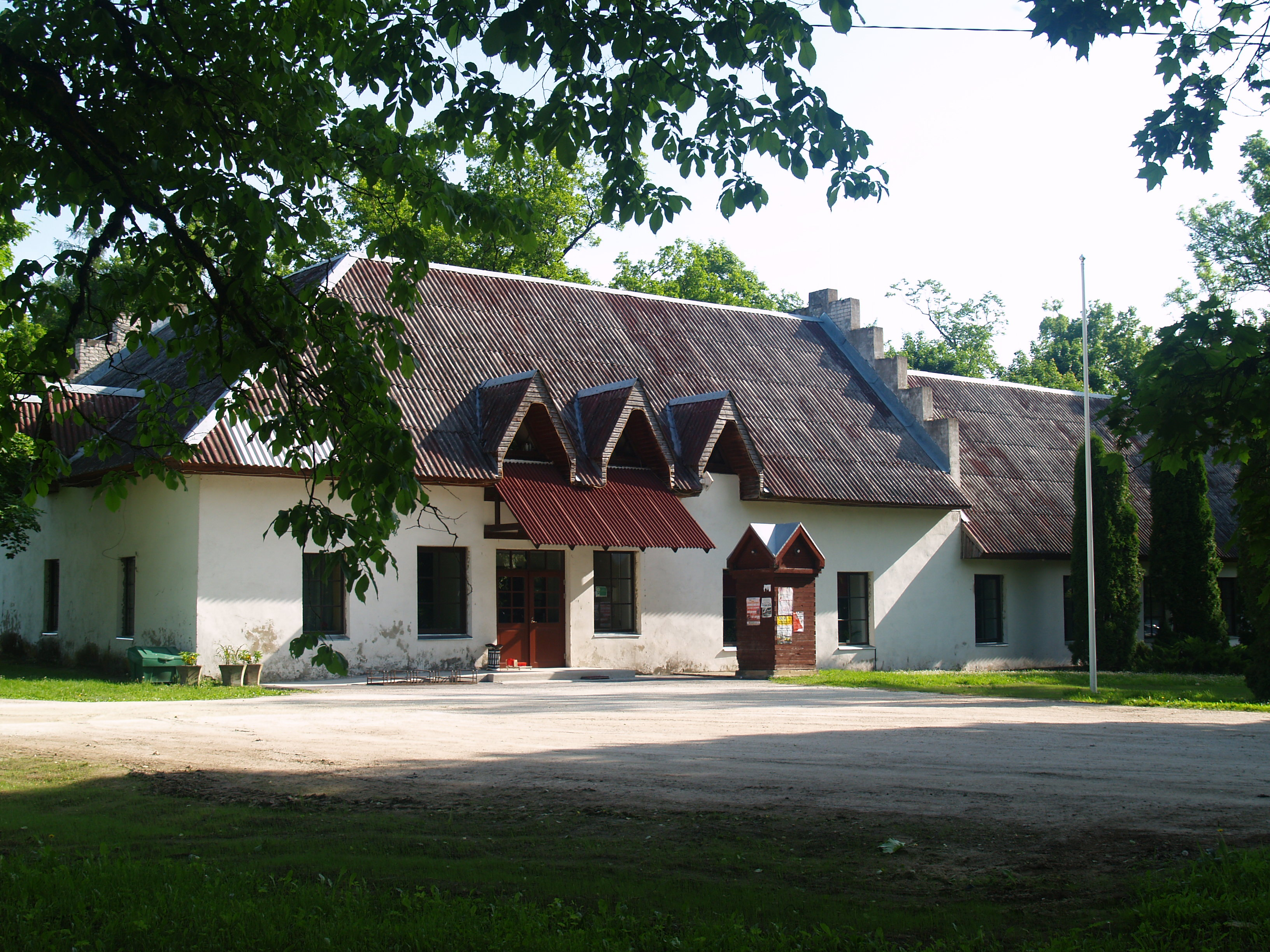
Lustivere cultural center

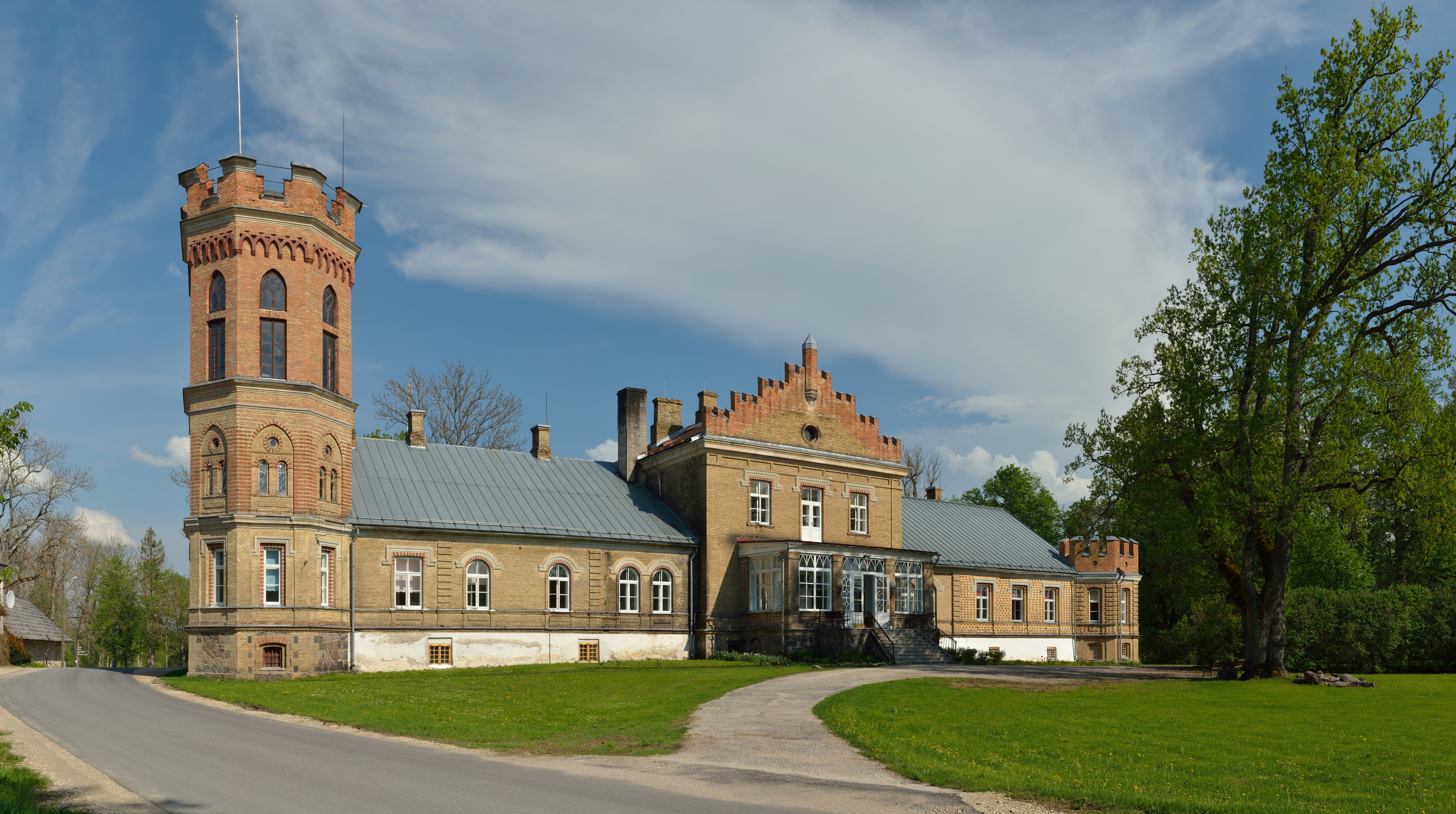
Lustivere Manor

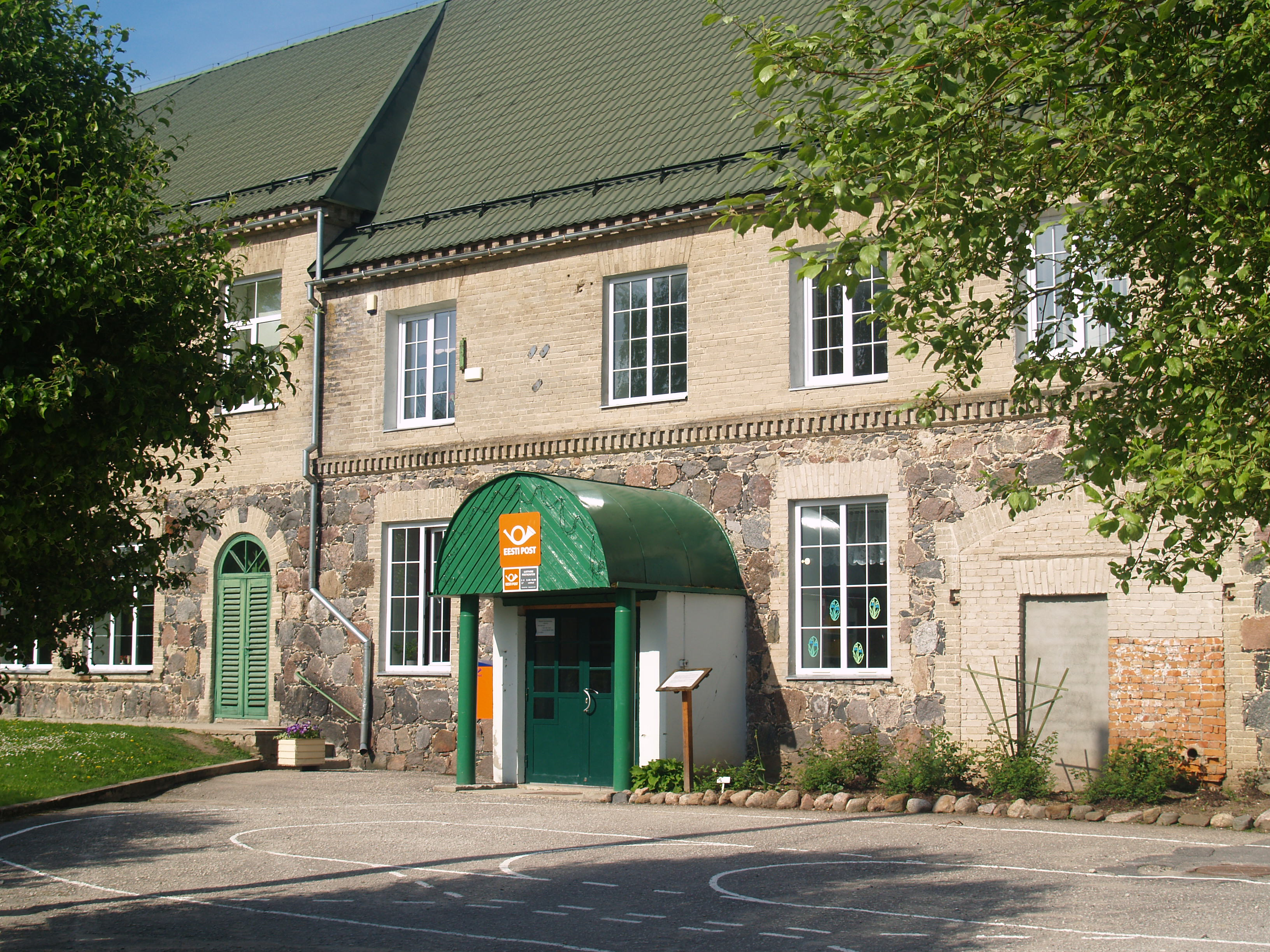
Post office

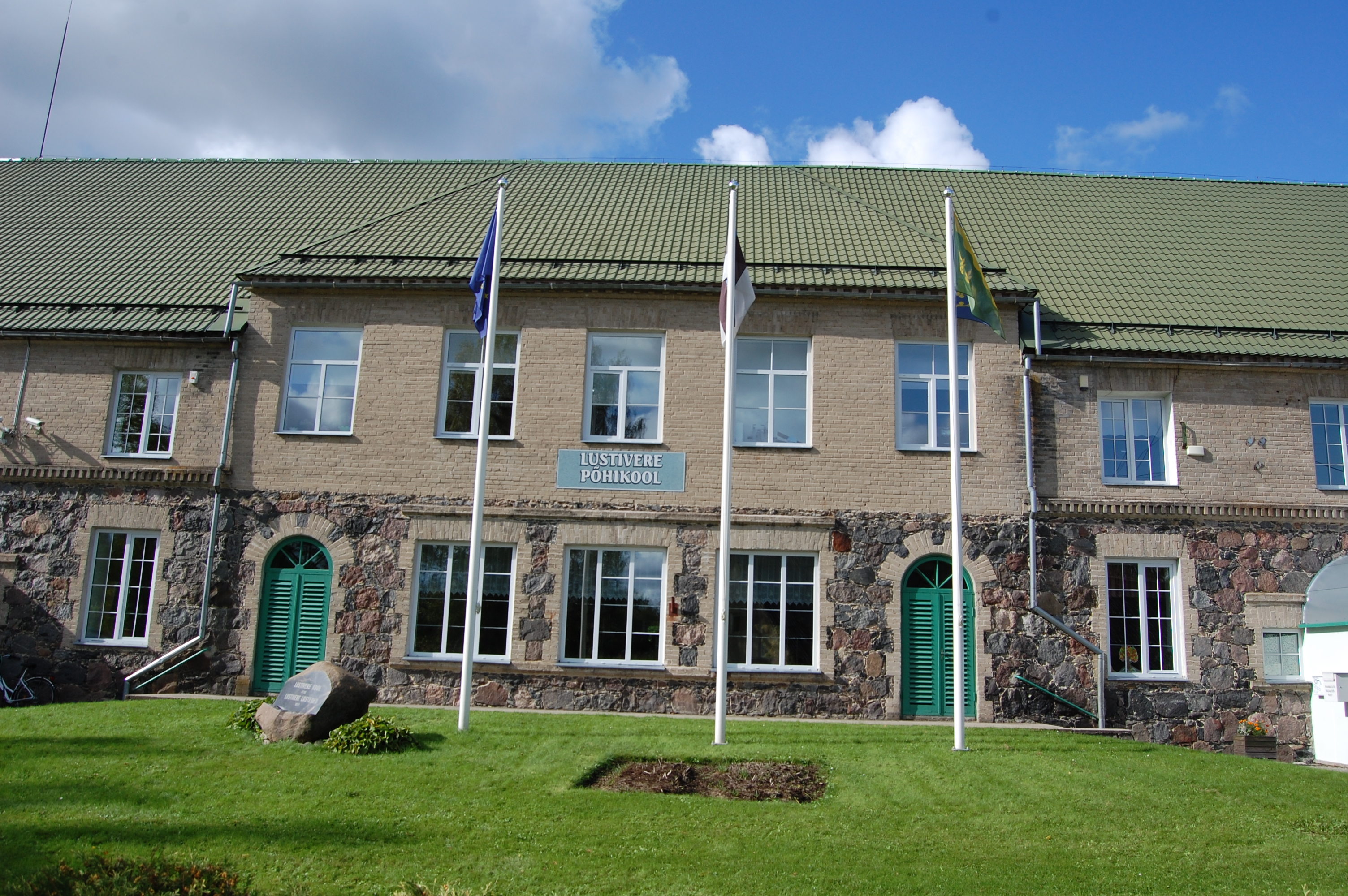
Lustivere school

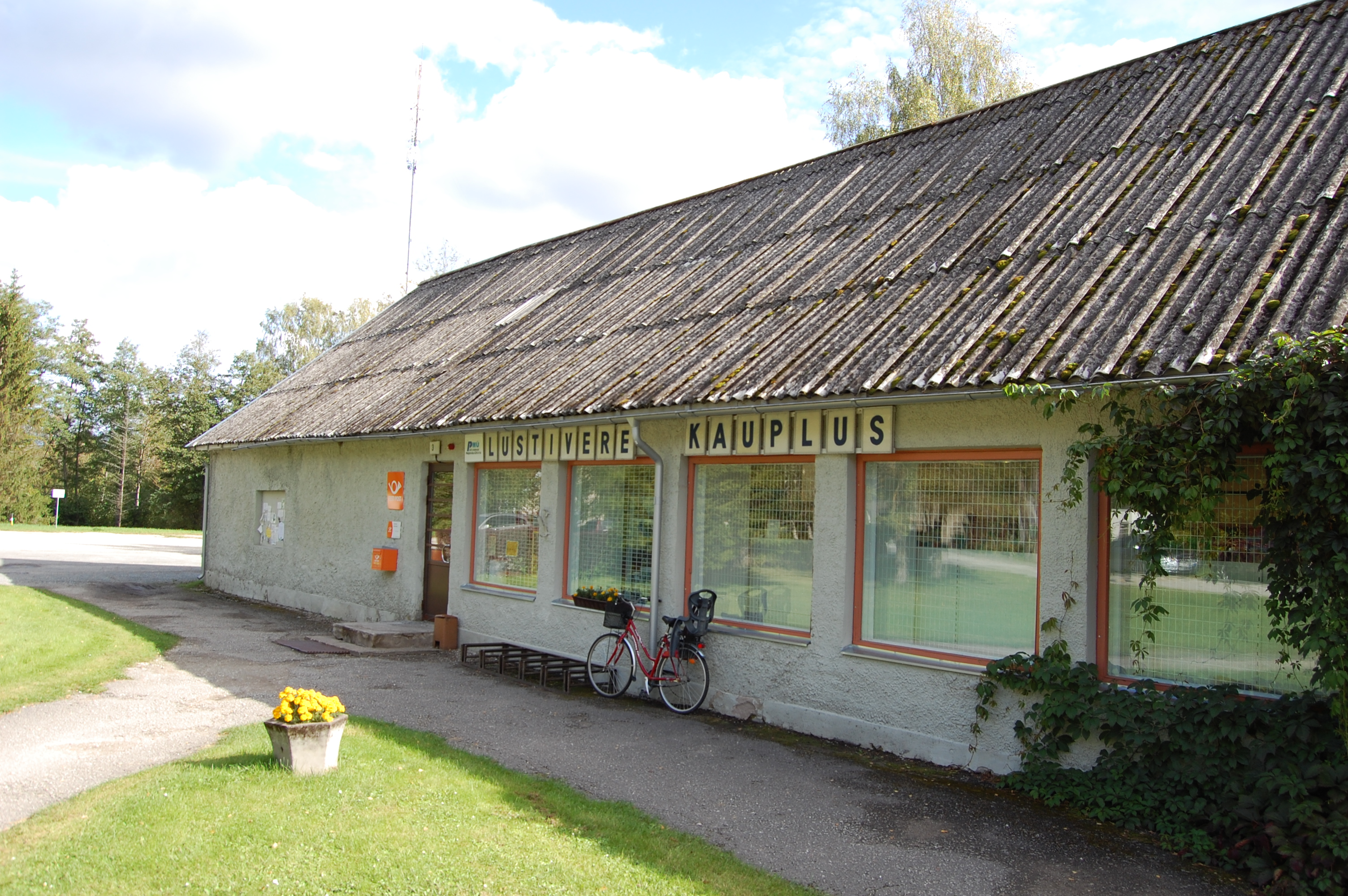
Small shop in Lustivere

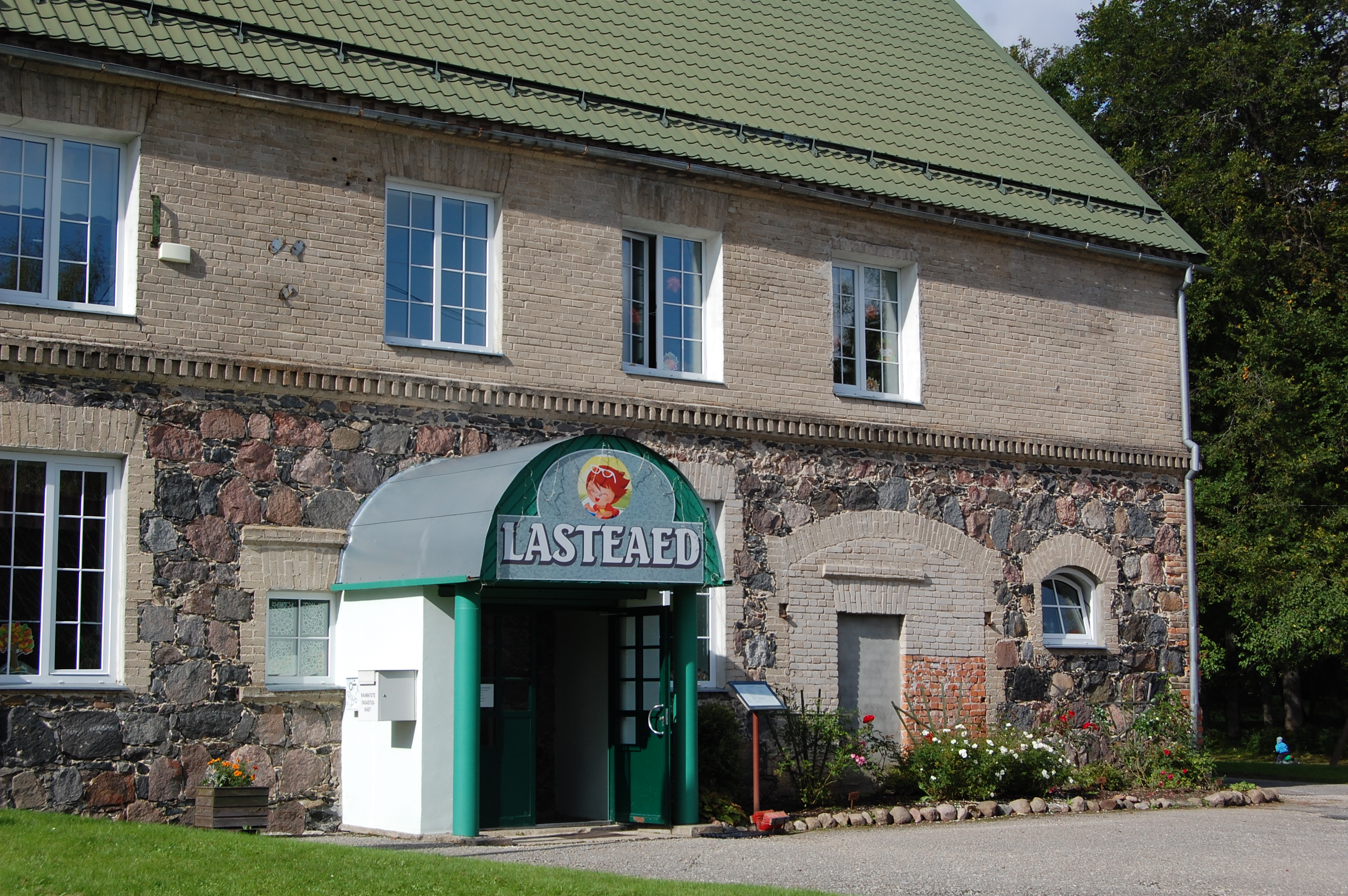
Kindergarten
