= Esku =

Village in Estonia

- Village
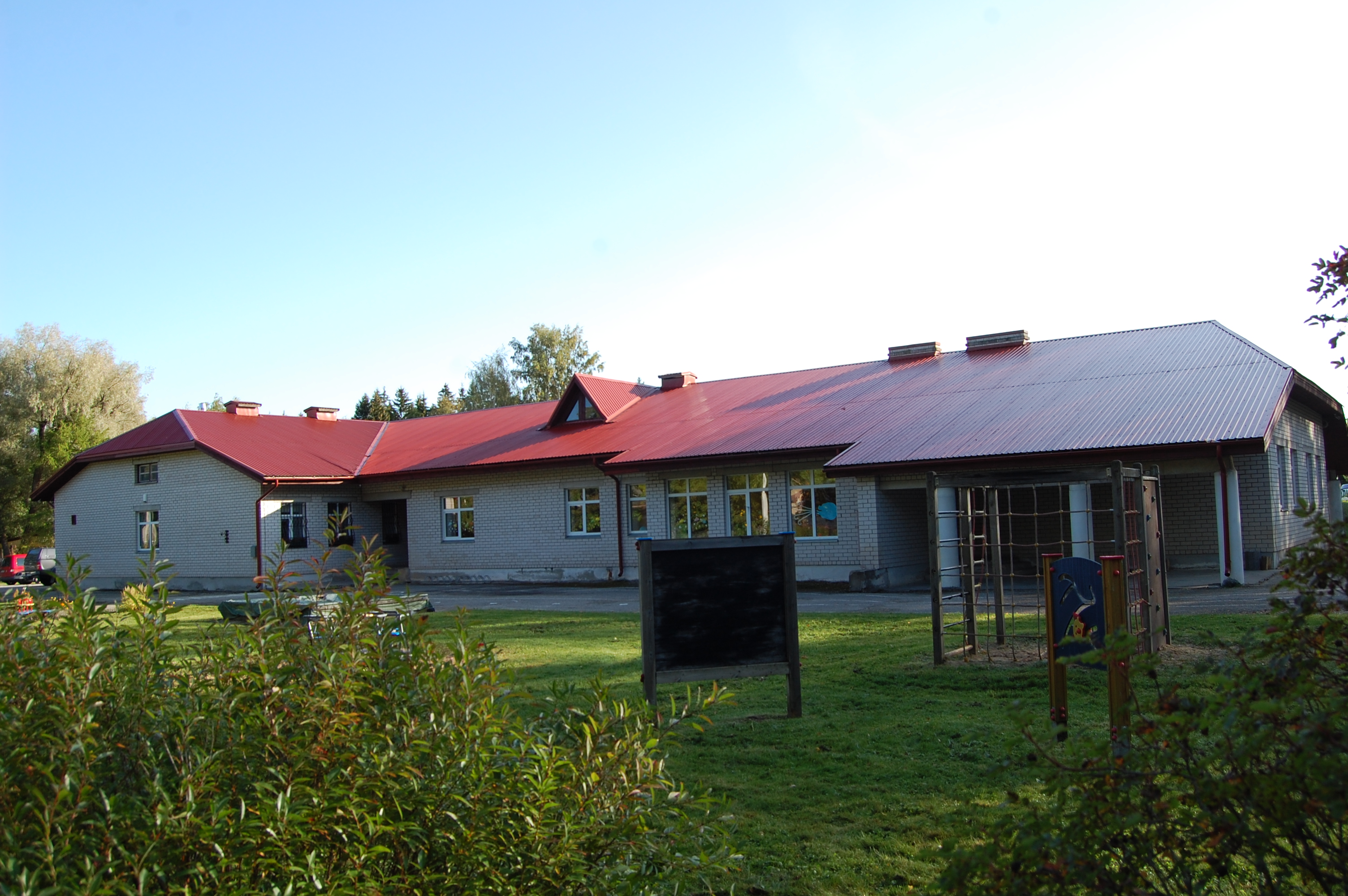
- Esku kindergarten

- Location in Estonia
- Coordinates: 58°38′26″N 25°53′30″E
- Country: Estonia
- County: Jõgeva County
- Municipality: Põltsamaa Parish

Population (2010)
  - Total: 384
- Website: eskuks.ee

Esku is a village in Põltsamaa Parish, Jõgeva County, Estonia. It's located about 5 km (3 mi) west of the town of Põltsamaa. Esku has a population of 384 (as of 2010).

Esku was built in the Soviet era as the centre of the V. I. Lenin Kolkhoz (named after Vladimir Lenin). It consisted of a big farm and apartment, service and administrative buildings.
