= Mõisaküla, Jõgeva County =

Village in Estonia

Coordinates: 58°42′30″N 26°01′55″E

Mõisaküla
- Village
- Interactive map of Mõisaküla
- Country: Estonia
- County: Jõgeva County
- Parish: Põltsamaa Parish
- Time zone: UTC+2 (EET)
  - Summer (DST): UTC+3 (EEST)

Mõisaküla is a village in Põltsamaa Parish, Jõgeva County in eastern Estonia.
