= Lahavere =

Village in Estonia

Coordinates: 58°45′N 26°08′E

- village
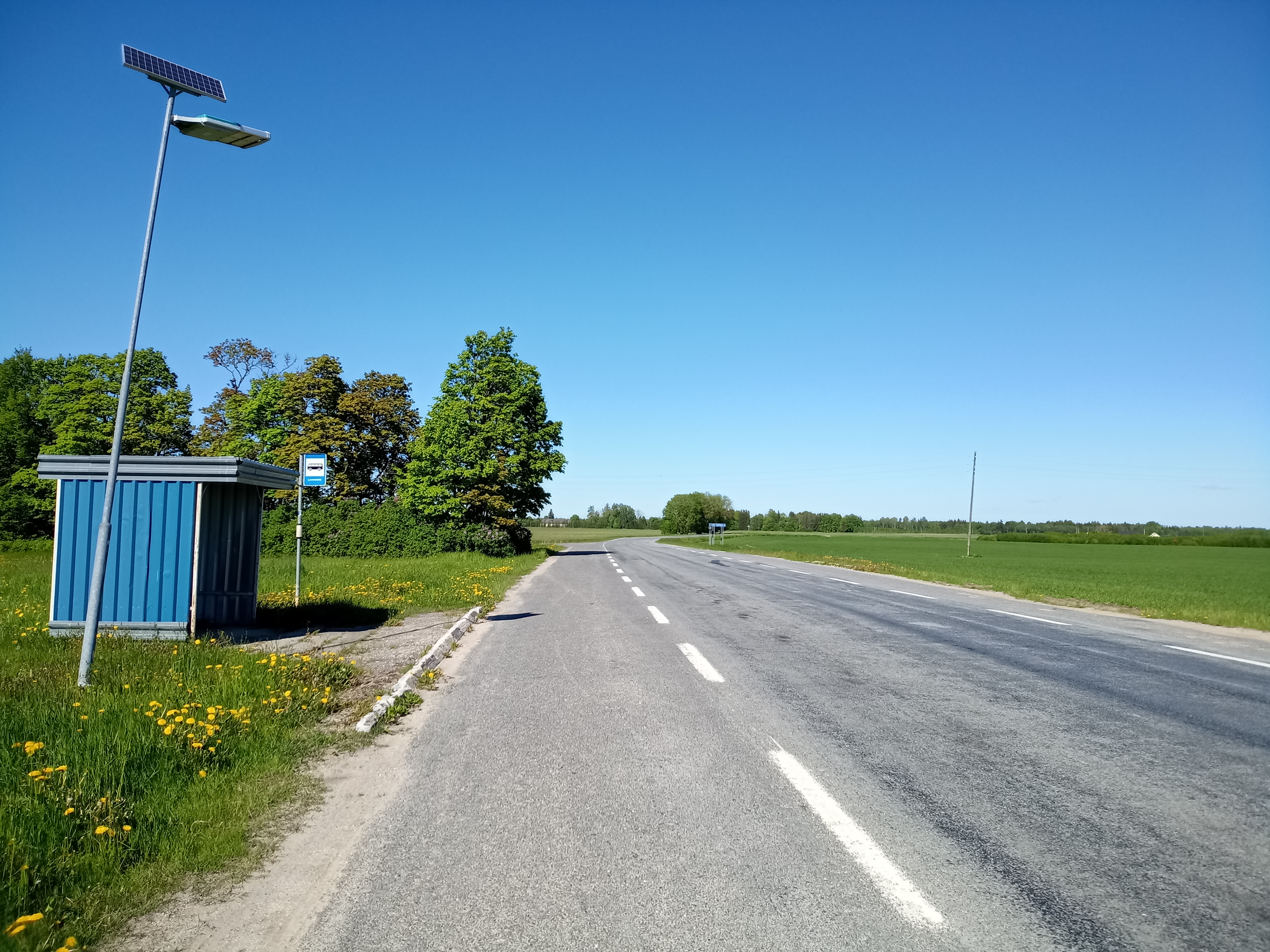
- Bus stop in Lahavere, Estonia
- Interactive map of Lahavere
- Country: Estonia
- County: Jõgeva County
- Parish: Põltsamaa Parish
- Time zone: UTC+2 (EET)
  - Summer (DST): UTC+3 (EEST)

Lahavere is a village in Põltsamaa Parish, Jõgeva County in eastern Estonia.
