= Kauru, Estonia =

Village in Estonia

Coordinates: 58°46′23″N 26°06′23″E

Kauru
- Village
- Interactive map of Kauru
- Country: Estonia
- County: Jõgeva County
- Parish: Põltsamaa Parish
- Time zone: UTC+2 (EET)
  - Summer (DST): UTC+3 (EEST)

Kauru is a village in Põltsamaa Parish, Jõgeva County in eastern Estonia.
