= Kose, Jõgeva County =

Village in Estonia

Coordinates: 58°44′45″N 26°12′03″E

Kose
- Village
- Interactive map of Kose
- Country: Estonia
- County: Jõgeva County
- Parish: Põltsamaa Parish
- Time zone: UTC+2 (EET)
  - Summer (DST): UTC+3 (EEST)

Kose is a village in Põltsamaa Parish, Jõgeva County in eastern Estonia.
