= Mõhküla =

Village in Estonia

Coordinates: 58°40′N 25°55′E

- Village
- Interactive map of Mõhküla
- Country: Estonia
- County: Jõgeva County
- Parish: Põltsamaa Parish
- Time zone: UTC+2 (EET)
  - Summer (DST): UTC+3 (EEST)

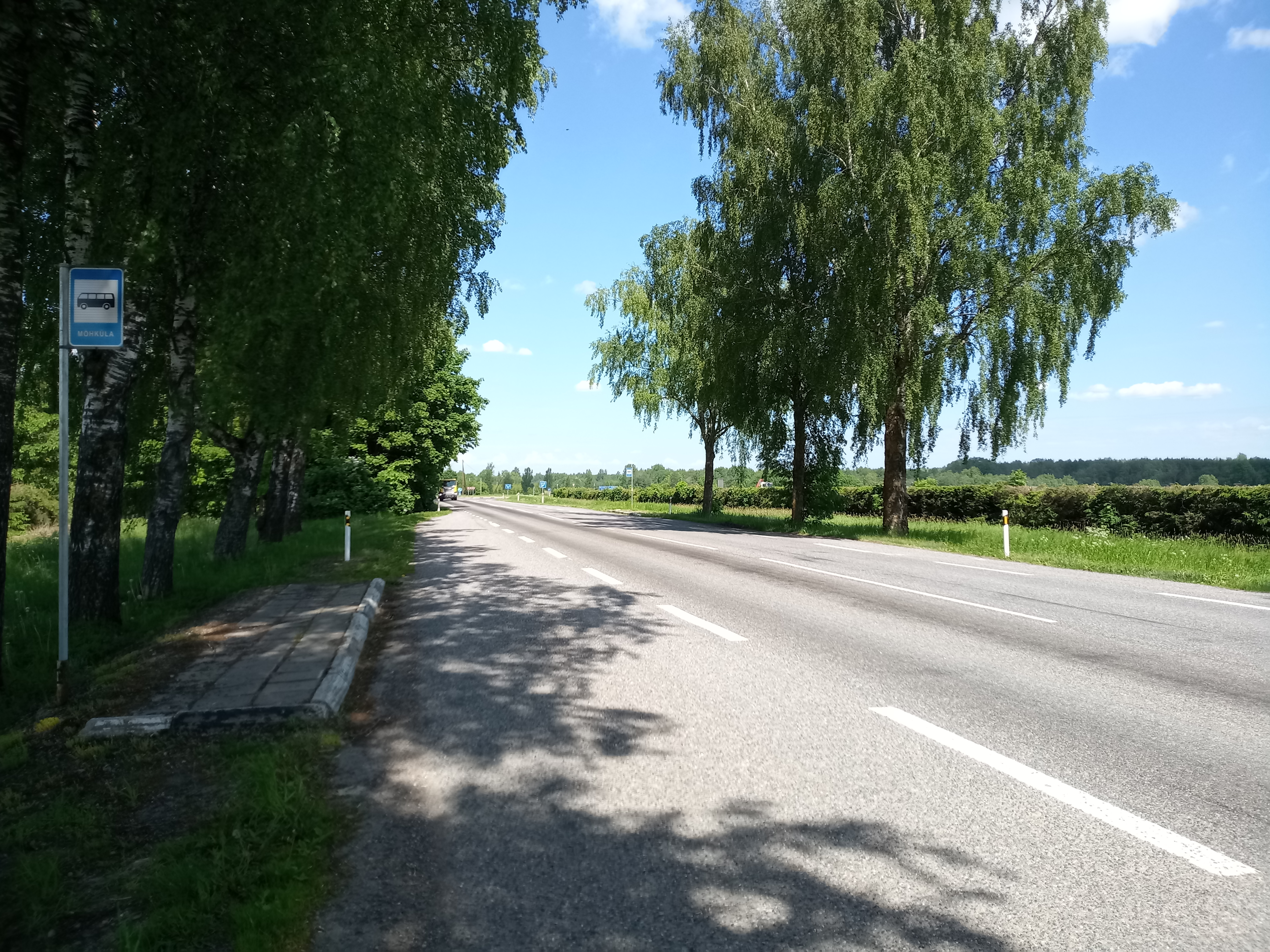
A Mõhküla bus stop in 2021

Mõhküla is a village in Põltsamaa Parish, Jõgeva County in eastern Estonia.
