= Tammiku, Jõgeva County =

Village in Estonia

Tammiku
- Village
- Location within Estonia
- Coordinates: 58.612222222222°N 26.328611111111°E
- Country: Estonia
- County: Jõgeva County
- Parish: Põltsamaa Parish
- Time zone: UTC+2 (EET)
  - Summer (DST): UTC+3 (EEST)

Tammiku is a village in Põltsamaa Parish, Jõgeva County in Estonia.

== Name ==
Tammiku was mentioned in written records as Thammik in 1582, Tamick in 1628, and Tam̄ikult in 1797. The name (in the genitive case) comes from the common noun tammik 'oak forest', referring to the local vegetation.
