= Nõmavere =

Village in Estonia

Coordinates: 58°38′N 25°52′E

- Village
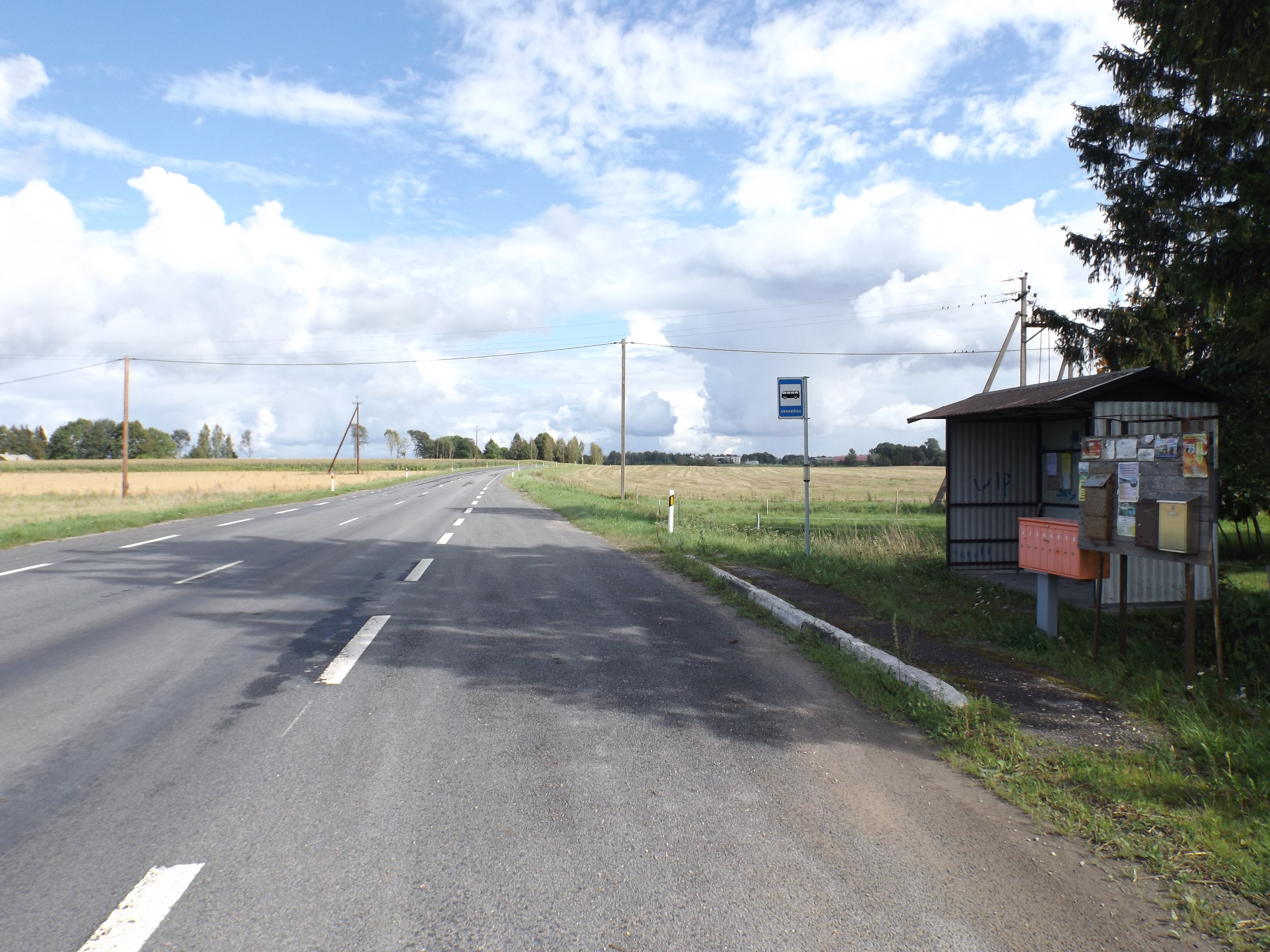
- Bus stop in Nõmavere, Põltsamaa Parish
- Interactive map of Nõmavere
- Country: Estonia
- County: Jõgeva County
- Parish: Põltsamaa Parish
- Time zone: UTC+2 (EET)
  - Summer (DST): UTC+3 (EEST)

Nõmavere is a village in Põltsamaa Parish, Jõgeva County in eastern Estonia.
