= Kaliküla =

Village in Estonia

- Village
- Location in Estonia
- Coordinates: 58°38′15″N 26°5′2″E
- Country: Estonia
- County: Jõgeva County
- Municipality: Poltsamaa Parish

Population (2020)
  - Total: 64

Kaliküla is a village in Põltsamaa Parish, Jõgeva County in eastern Estonia.
