= Kõrkküla, Jõgeva County =

Village in Estonia

Coordinates: 58°47′N 25°58′E

Kõrkküla
- Village
- Interactive map of Kõrkküla
- Country: Estonia
- County: Jõgeva County
- Parish: Põltsamaa Parish
- Time zone: UTC+2 (EET)
  - Summer (DST): UTC+3 (EEST)

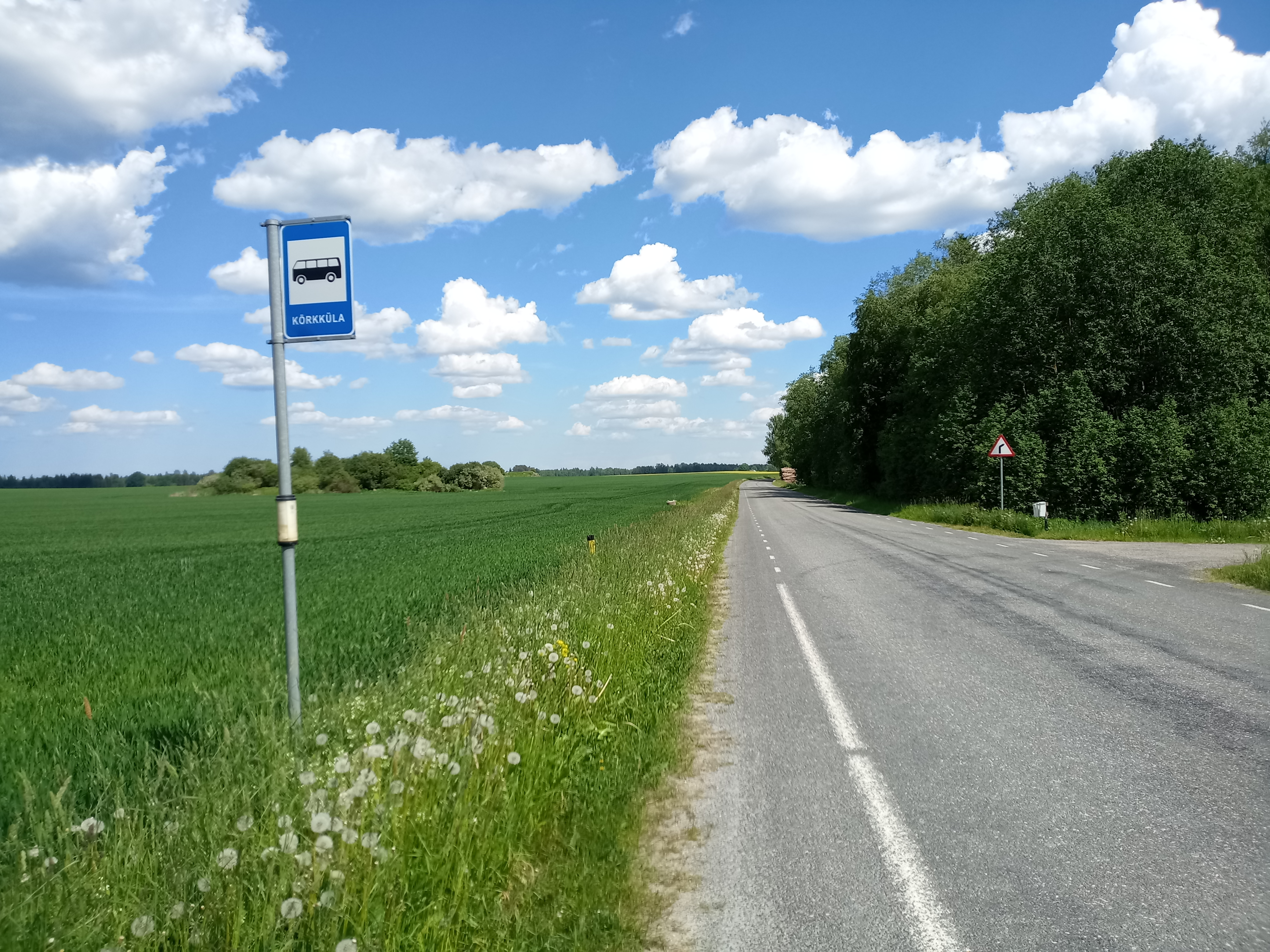
Kõrkküla bus stop, Põltsamaa municipality, 2021

Kõrkküla is a village in Põltsamaa Parish, Jõgeva County in eastern Estonia.
