= Vorsti, Jõgeva County =

Village in Estonia

Coordinates: 58°42′23″N 25°58′37″E

Vorsti
- Village
- Interactive map of Vorsti
- Country: Estonia
- County: Jõgeva County
- Parish: Põltsamaa Parish
- Time zone: UTC+2 (EET)
  - Summer (DST): UTC+3 (EEST)

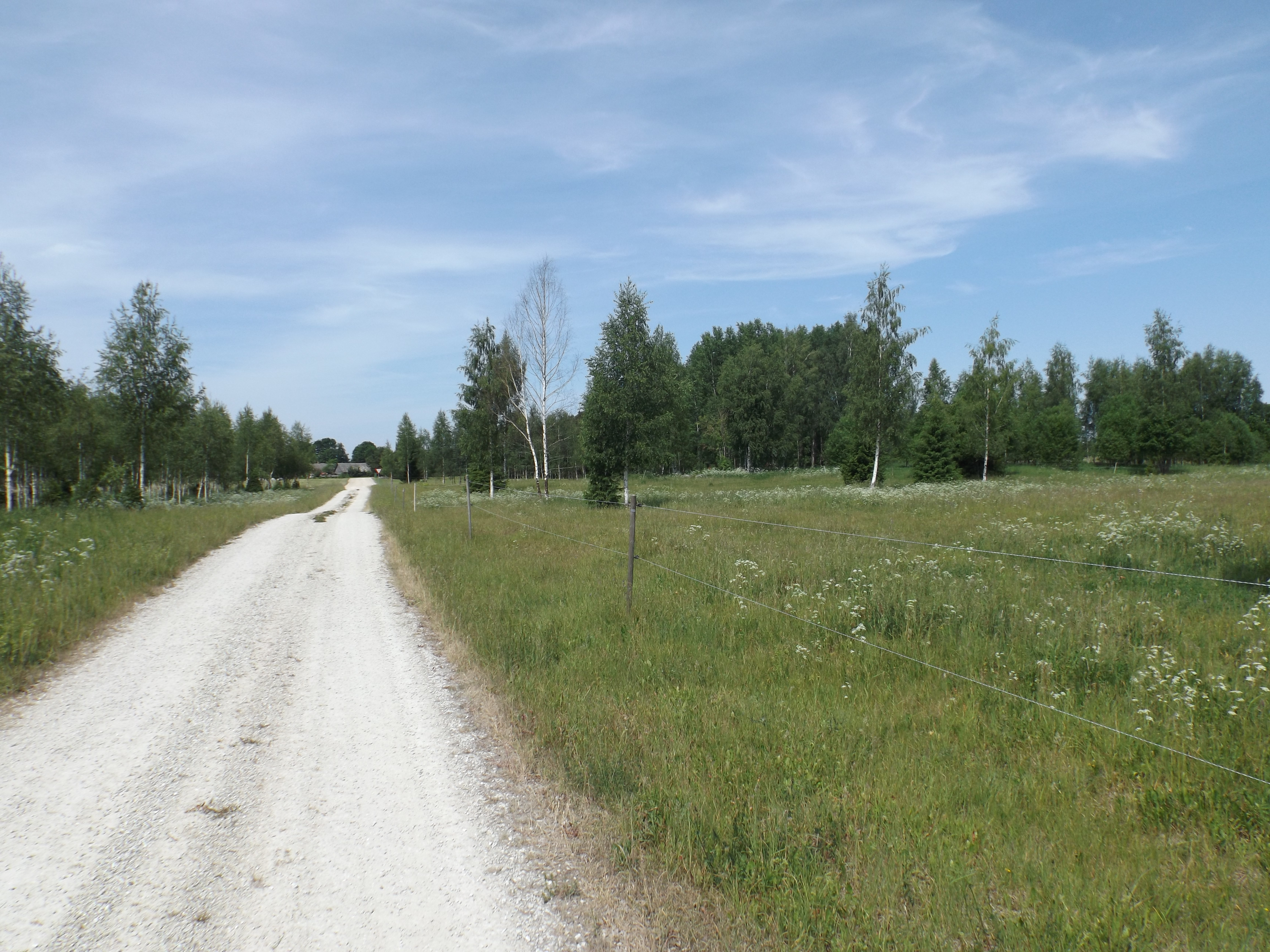
Road in Vorsti

Vorsti is a village in Põltsamaa Parish, Jõgeva County in eastern Estonia.
