= Vägari =

Village in Estonia

Coordinates: 58°45′N 26°15′E

- Village
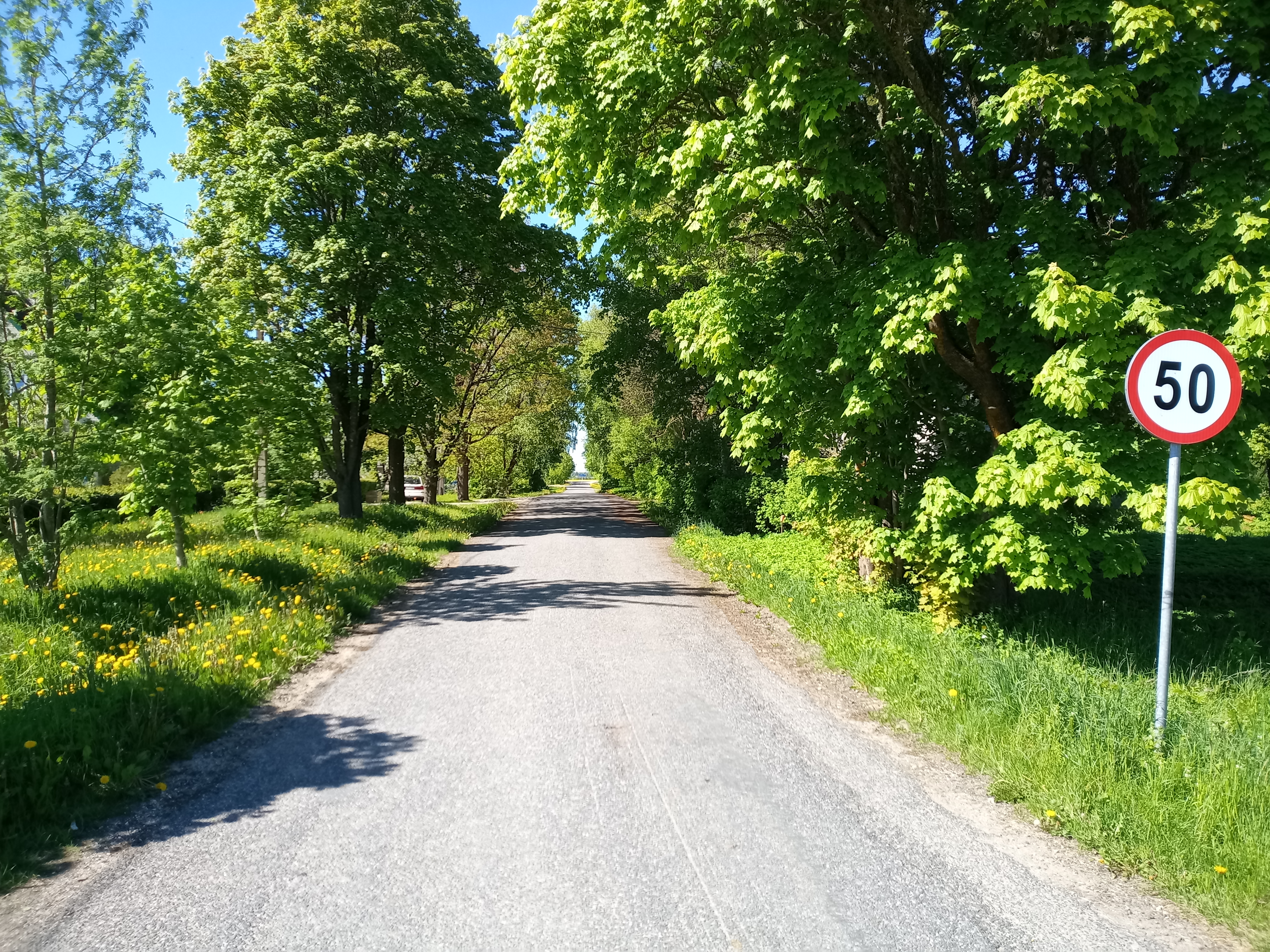
- Road in Vägari, Estonia
- Interactive map of Vägari
- Country: Estonia
- County: Jõgeva County
- Parish: Põltsamaa Parish
- Time zone: UTC+2 (EET)
  - Summer (DST): UTC+3 (EEST)

Vägari is a village in Põltsamaa Parish, Jõgeva County in eastern Estonia.
