= Kaavere, Jõgeva County =

Village in Estonia

Coordinates: 58°41′52″N 26°08′22″E

Kaavere
- Village
- Interactive map of Kaavere
- Country: Estonia
- County: Jõgeva County
- Parish: Põltsamaa Parish
- Time zone: UTC+2 (EET)
  - Summer (DST): UTC+3 (EEST)

Kaavere is a village in Põltsamaa Parish, Jõgeva County in eastern Estonia.
