= Rõstla =

Village in Estonia

Coordinates: 58°38′N 25°50′E

- Village
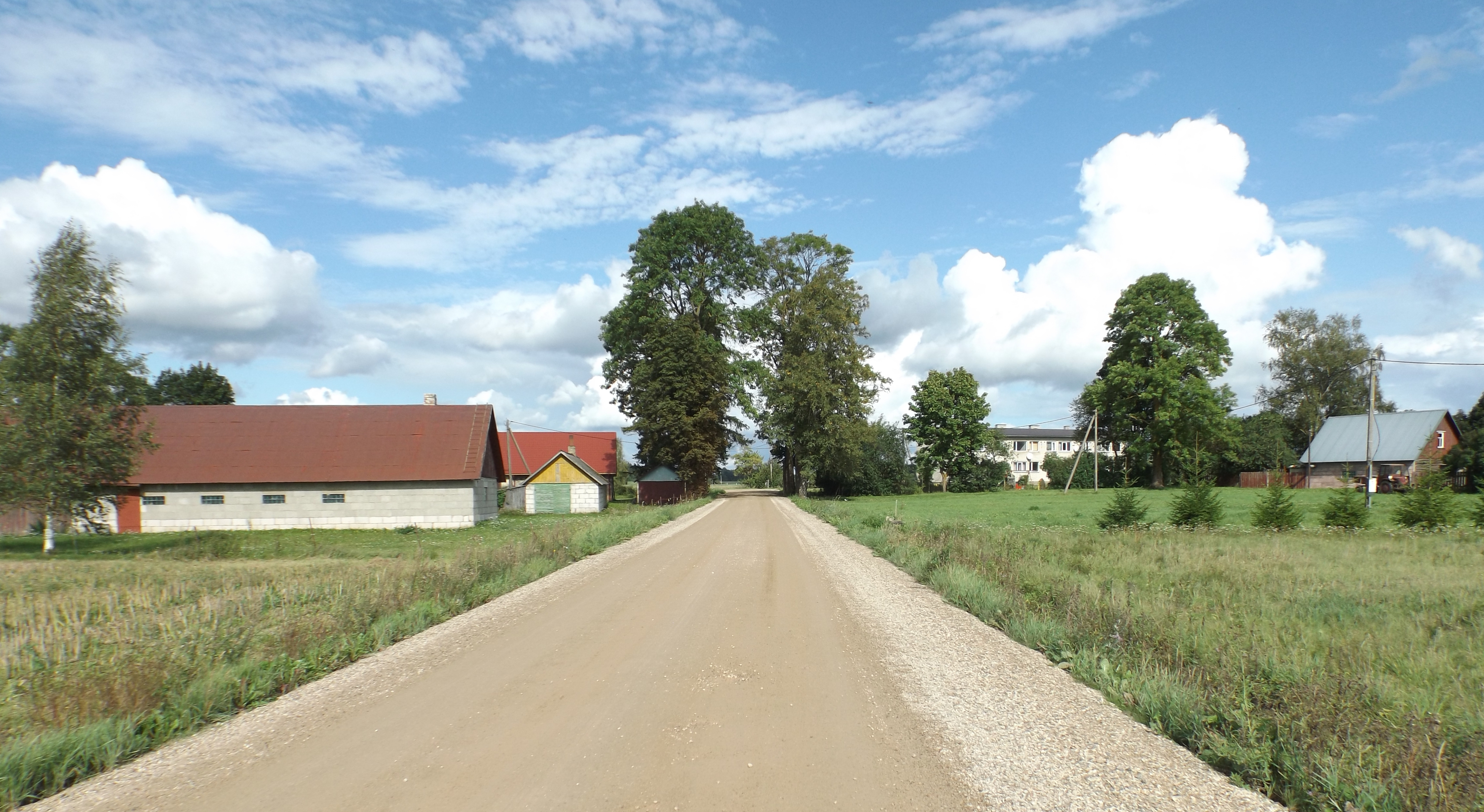
- Interactive map of Rõstla
- Country: Estonia
- County: Jõgeva County
- Parish: Põltsamaa Parish
- Time zone: UTC+2 (EET)
  - Summer (DST): UTC+3 (EEST)

Rõstla is a village in Põltsamaa Parish, Jõgeva County in eastern Estonia.
