= Laasme =

Village in Estonia

- Village
- Location within Estonia
- Coordinates: 58.595°N 26.2875°E
- Country: Estonia
- County: Jõgeva County
- Parish: Põltsamaa Parish
- Time zone: UTC+2 (EET)
  - Summer (DST): UTC+3 (EEST)

Laasme is a village in Põltsamaa Parish, Jõgeva County in Estonia.
