= Uuevälja =

Village in Estonia

Coordinates: 58°44′48″N 25°57′52″E

- Village
- Interactive map of Uuevälja
- Country: Estonia
- County: Jõgeva County
- Parish: Põltsamaa Parish
- Time zone: UTC+2 (EET)
  - Summer (DST): UTC+3 (EEST)

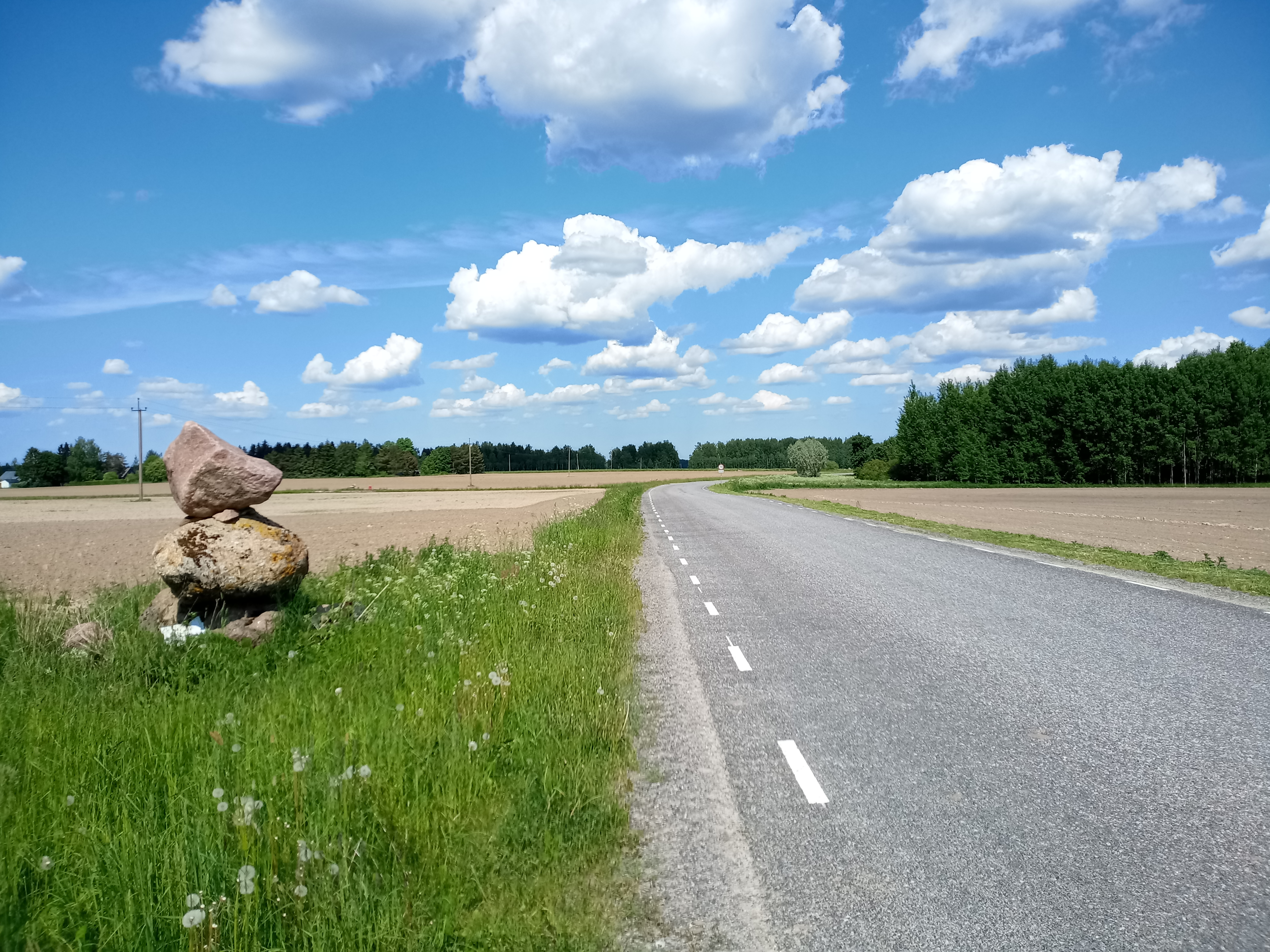
Road in Uuevälja village, Põltsamaa rural municipality (June 2021)

Uuevälja is a village in Põltsamaa Parish, Jõgeva County in eastern Estonia.
