= Luige, Jõgeva County =

Village in Estonia

Coordinates: 58°45′N 25°59′E

Luige
- Village
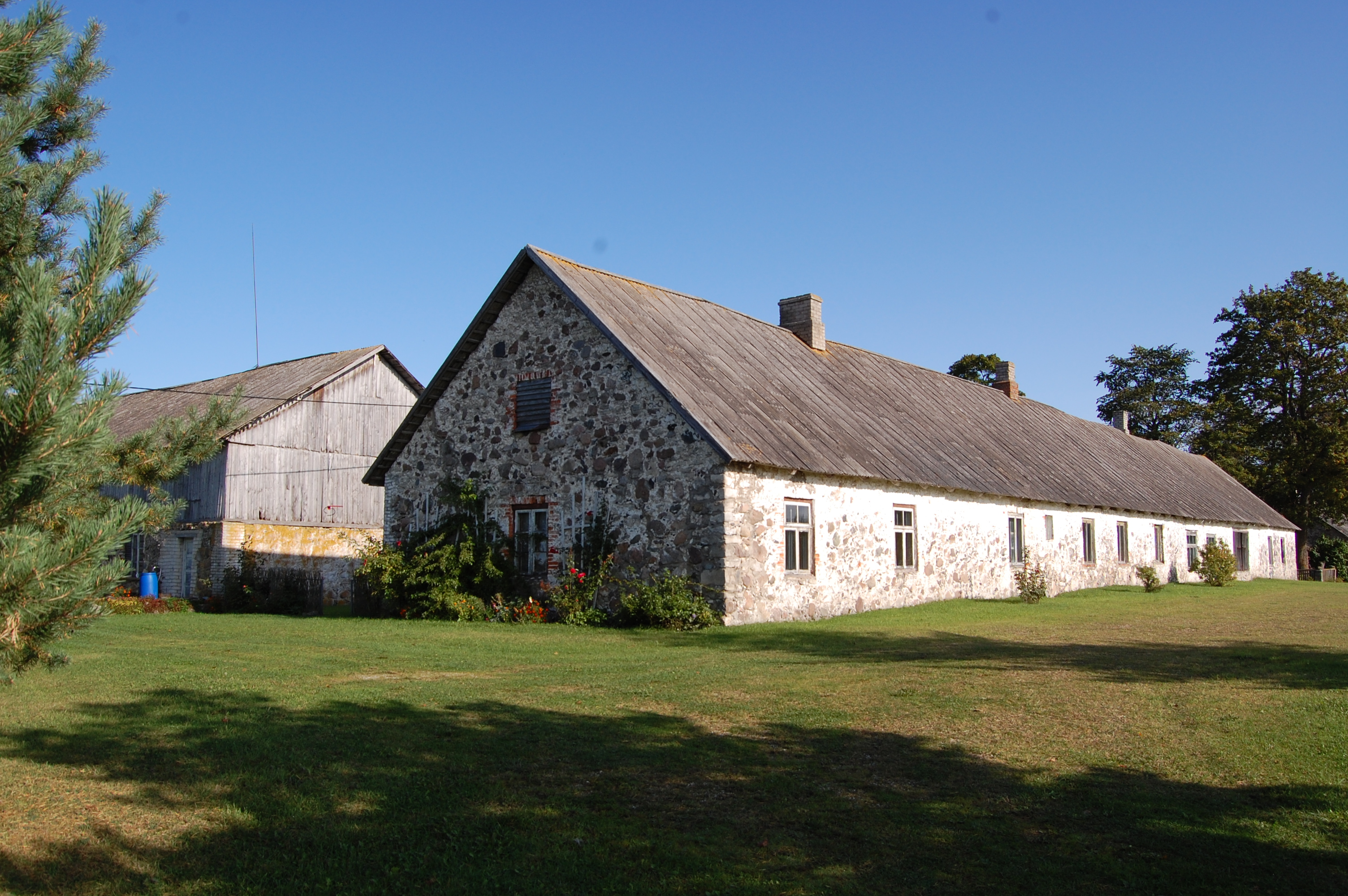
- Interactive map of Luige
- Country: Estonia
- County: Jõgeva County
- Parish: Põltsamaa Parish
- Time zone: UTC+2 (EET)
  - Summer (DST): UTC+3 (EEST)

Luige is a village in Põltsamaa Parish, Jõgeva County in eastern Estonia.
