= Arisvere =

Village in Estonia

Coordinates: 58°47′N 26°02′E

- Village
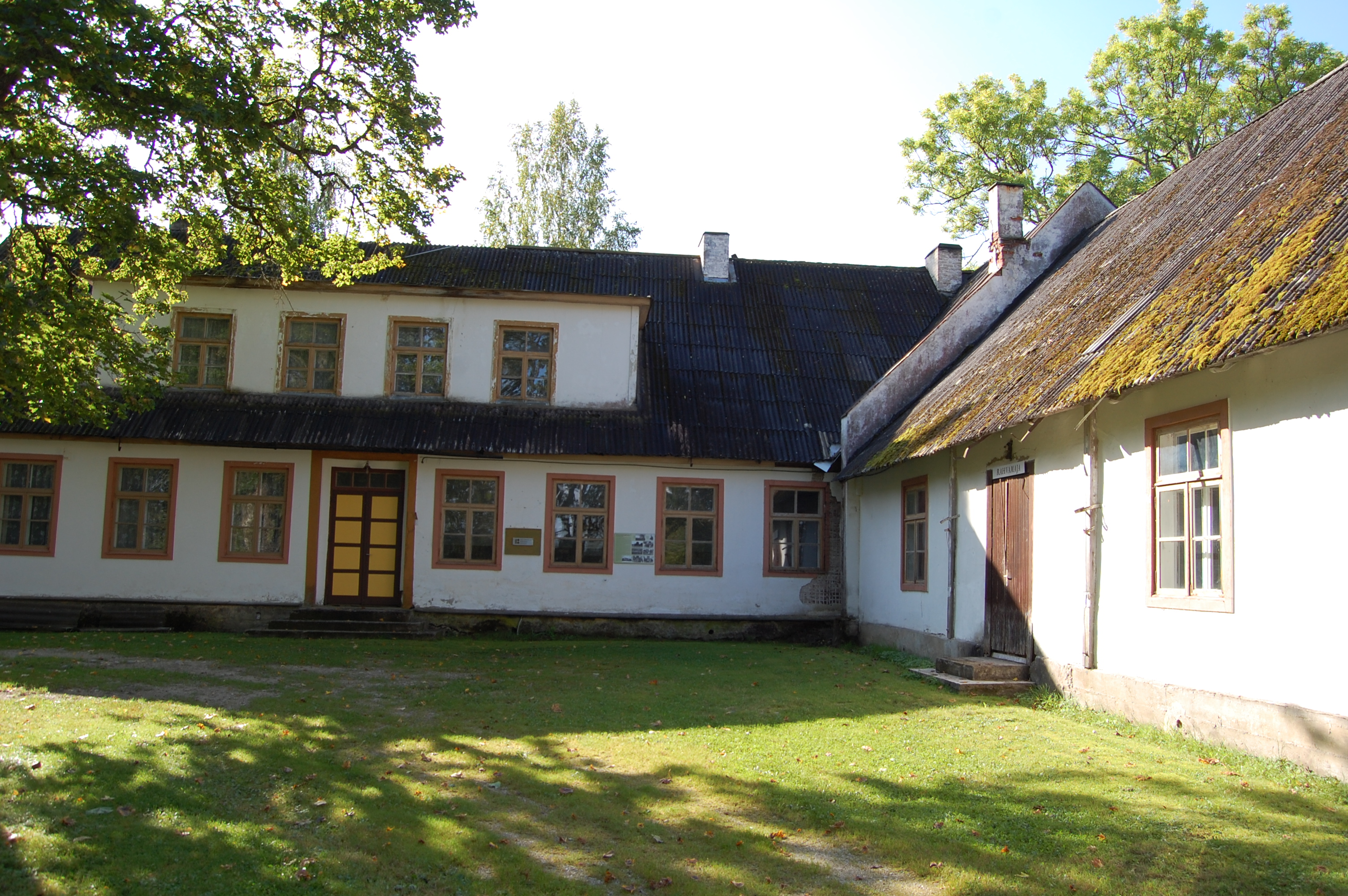
- Arisvere community center, former school.
- Interactive map of Arisvere
- Country: Estonia
- County: Jõgeva County
- Parish: Põltsamaa Parish
- Time zone: UTC+2 (EET)
  - Summer (DST): UTC+3 (EEST)

Arisvere is a village in Põltsamaa Parish, Jõgeva County in eastern Estonia.
