= Tõrve =

Village in Estonia

- Village
- Location within Estonia
- Coordinates: 58.609444444444°N 26.381388888889°E
- Country: Estonia
- County: Jõgeva County
- Parish: Põltsamaa Parish
- Time zone: UTC+2 (EET)
  - Summer (DST): UTC+3 (EEST)

Tõrve is a village in Põltsamaa Parish, Jõgeva County in Estonia.
