= Pudivere, Jõgeva County =

Village in Estonia

Coordinates: 58°39′58″N 26°09′16″E

Pudivere
- Village
- Interactive map of Pudivere
- Country: Estonia
- County: Jõgeva County
- Parish: Põltsamaa Parish
- Time zone: UTC+2 (EET)
  - Summer (DST): UTC+3 (EEST)

Pudivere is a village in Põltsamaa Parish, Jõgeva County in eastern Estonia.
