= Puduküla =

Village in Estonia

- Village
- Location within Estonia
- Coordinates: 58°43′N 25°54′E
- Country: Estonia
- County: Jõgeva County
- Parish: Põltsamaa Parish

Population (2006)
  - Total: 51
- Time zone: UTC+2 (EET)
  - Summer (DST): UTC+3 (EEST)

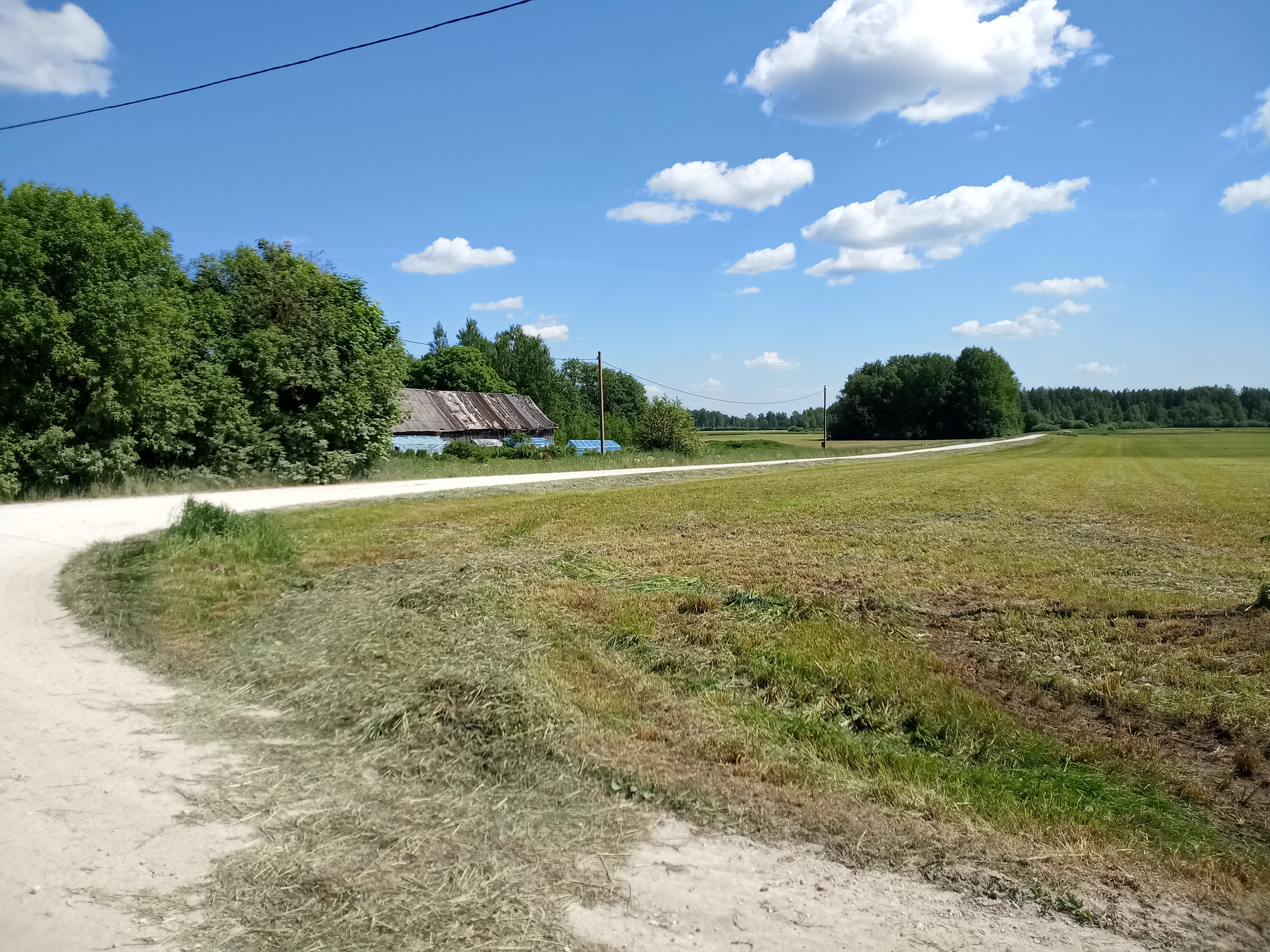
A road in the village

Puduküla is a village in Põltsamaa Parish, Jõgeva County in eastern Estonia.
