= Kalme, Jõgeva County =

Village in Estonia

Coordinates: 58°41′40″N 25°54′28″E

Kalme
- Village
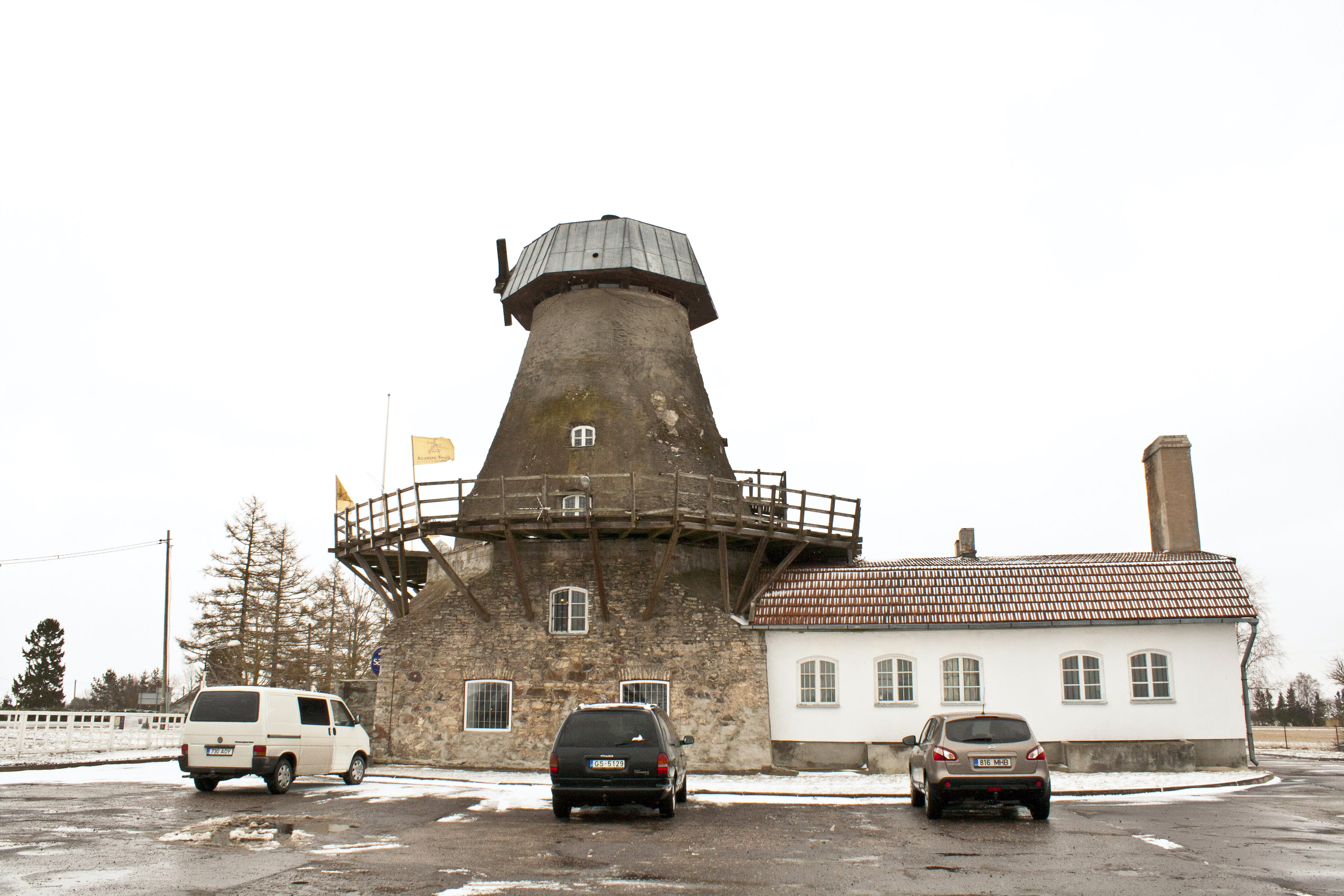
- Adavere windmeill in Kalme
- Interactive map of Kalme
- Country: Estonia
- County: Jõgeva County
- Parish: Põltsamaa Parish
- Time zone: UTC+2 (EET)
  - Summer (DST): UTC+3 (EEST)

Kalme is a village in Põltsamaa Parish, Jõgeva County in eastern Estonia.
