= Pilu, Estonia =

Village in Estonia

Coordinates: 58°42′42″N 25°48′30″E

Pilu
- Village
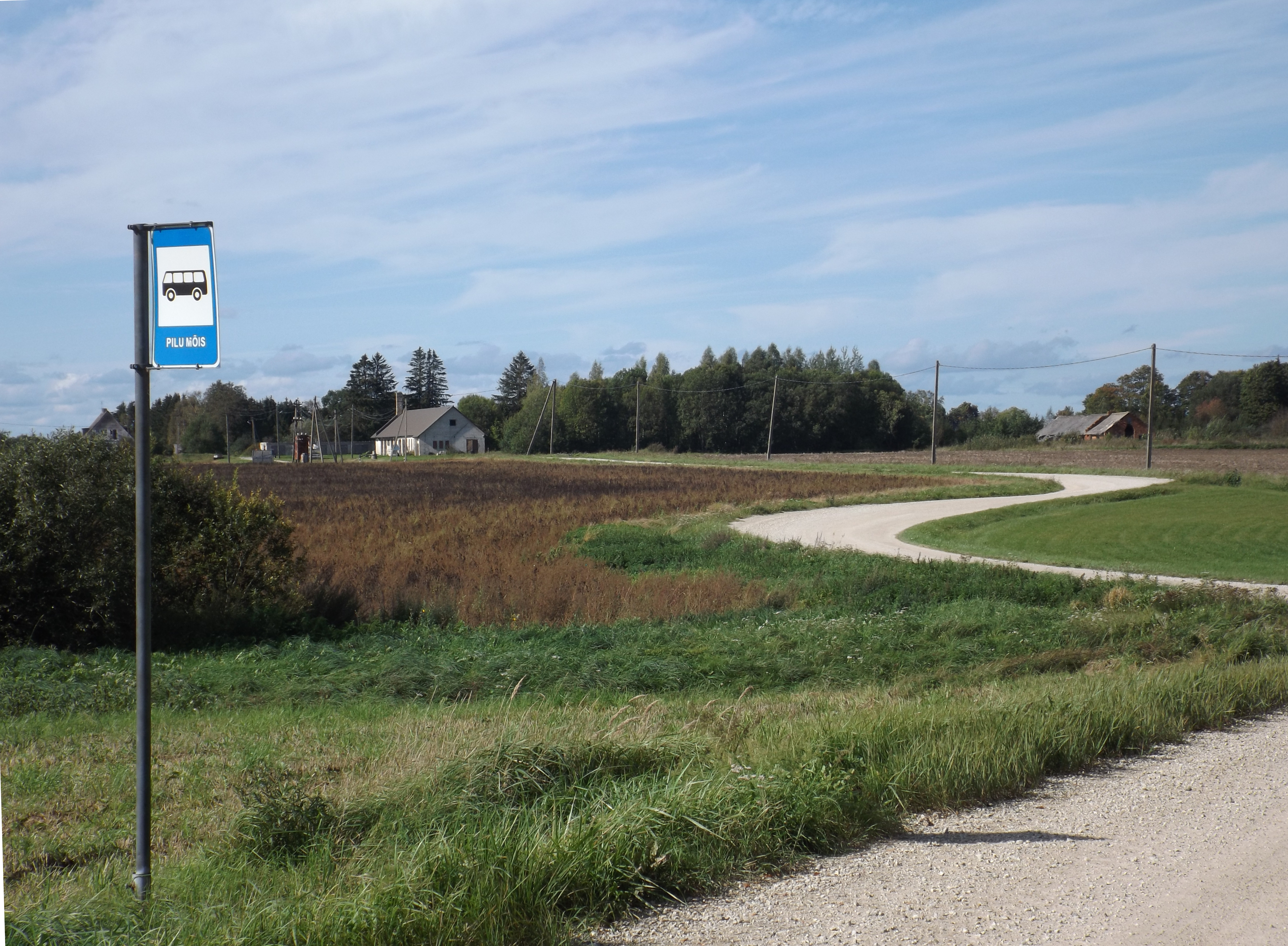
- Pilu village bust stop
- Interactive map of Pilu
- Country: Estonia
- County: Jõgeva County
- Parish: Põltsamaa Parish
- Time zone: UTC+2 (EET)
  - Summer (DST): UTC+3 (EEST)

Pilu is a village in Põltsamaa Parish, Jõgeva County in eastern Estonia.
