= Kõpu, Jõgeva County =

Village in Estonia

Coordinates: 58°45′00″N 26°14′29″E

Kõpu
- Village
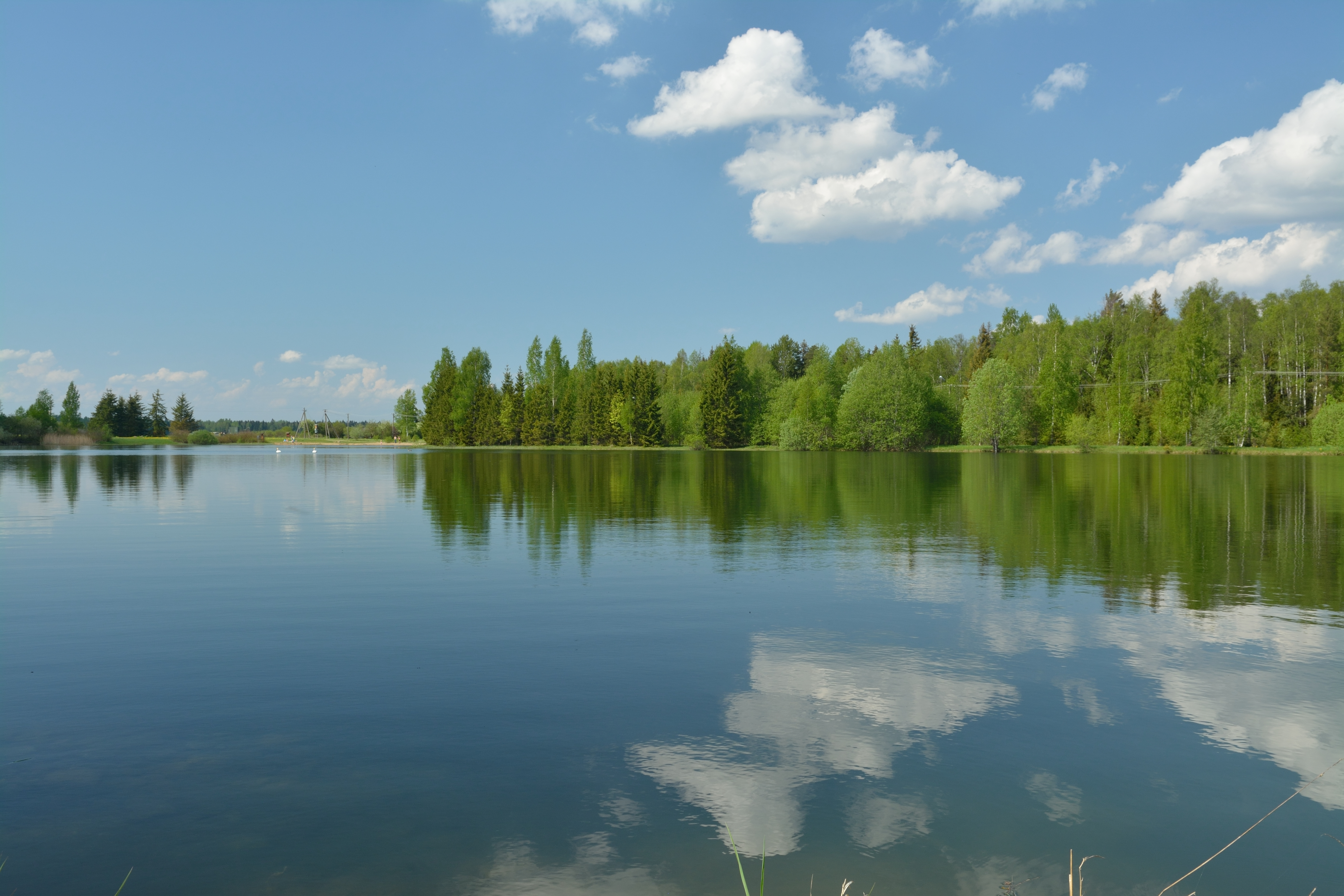
- Kõpu reservoir
- Interactive map of Kõpu
- Country: Estonia
- County: Jõgeva County
- Parish: Põltsamaa Parish
- Time zone: UTC+2 (EET)
  - Summer (DST): UTC+3 (EEST)

Kõpu is a village in Põltsamaa Parish, Jõgeva County in eastern Estonia.

It is located in the north of Lake Võrtsjärv and the counties of Viljandi and Tartu, south of Järva County, and near the Tallinn–Tartu highway.
