= Malara =

Orokolo god of the planet Venus

Malara, in the mythology of the Orokolo, of the south coast of Papua New Guinea, is the god of the planet Venus. The myths indicates that Malara was looking for wives. He found Eau and Havoa, the daughters of the sun-god Maelare, and married them.
