= Kõpu Parish =

Former municipality of Estonia

Coordinates: 58°19′35″N 25°18′23″E

Kõpu Parish Kõpu vald
- Municipality of Estonia
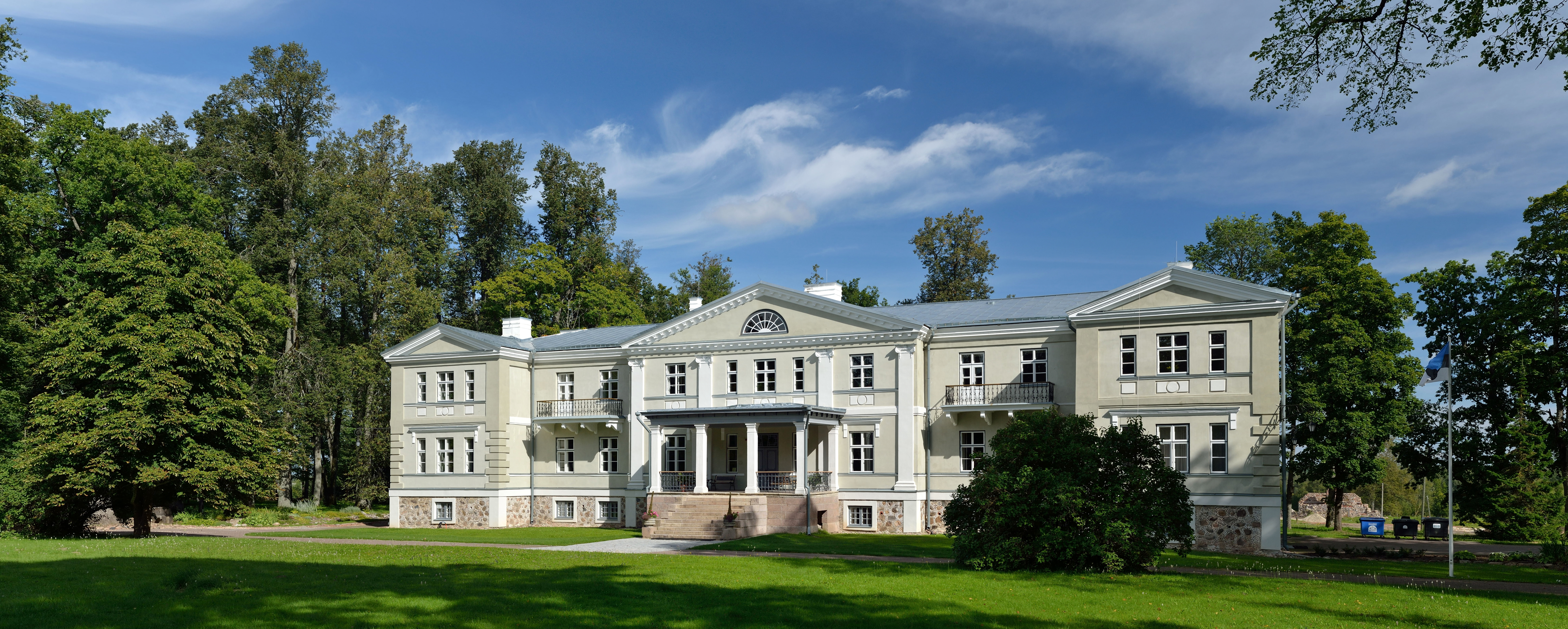
- Suure-Kõpu manor

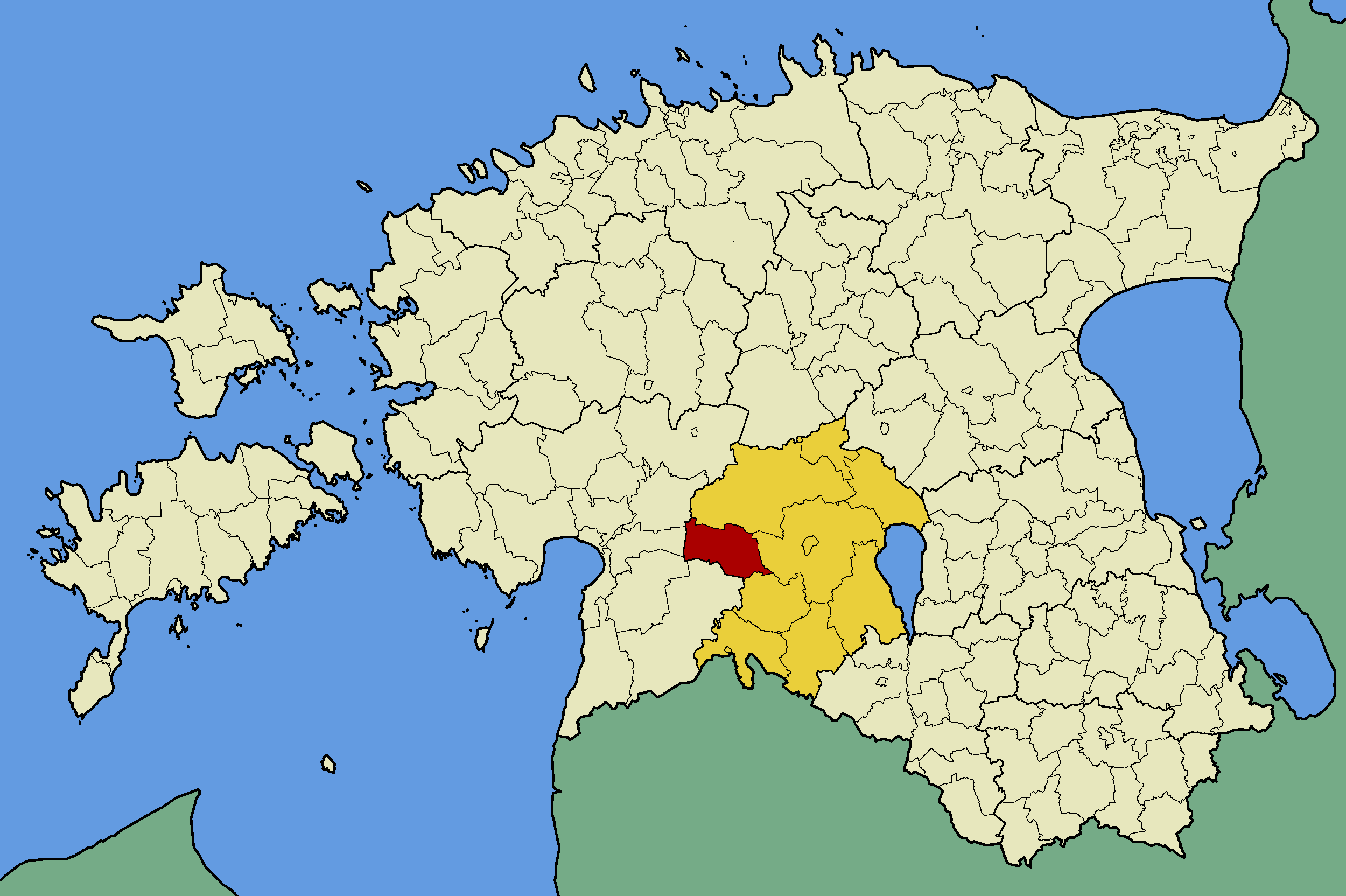
- Kõpu Parish within Viljandi County.
- Country: Estonia
- County: Viljandi County
- Administrative centre: Kõpu

Area
  - Total: 258.78 km^{2} (99.92 sq mi)

Population (01.01.2009)
  - Total: 802
  - Density: 3.10/km^{2} (8.03/sq mi)
- Website: vov.matti.ee/kopuvv

Kõpu Parish (Estonian: Kõpu vald) was a rural municipality of Estonia, in Viljandi County. It had a population of 802 (as of 1 January 2009) and an area of 258.78 km².

== Settlements ==
Small borough
Kõpu

Villages
Iia
Kuninga
Laane
Punaküla
Supsi
Seruküla
Tipu
Uia
Vanaveski
