= Kahvena Nature Reserve =

Protected area in Estonia

- Location within Estonia
- Location: Estonia
- Coordinates: 58°16′N 25°14′E
- Area: 660 ha (1,600 acres)
- Established: 2005

Kahvena Nature Reserve is a nature reserve which is located in Viljandi County, Estonia.

The area of the nature reserve is 660 ha.

The protected area was founded in 2005 to protect valuable habitat types and threatened species in Seruküla and Uia village (former Kõpu Parish) and in Kanaküla (Saarde Parish).
