= Peet Johanson =

Estonian politician and farmer

Peet Johanson (21 February 1881 – 1939/9 January 1951) was an Estonian farmer and politician.

Johanson was born on 21 February 1881 in Sürgavere Parish (now Põhja-Sakala Parish) in Kreis Fellin and worked as a farmer. He graduated from Viljandi Parish School in 1895. He was elected to the Estonian Provincial Assembly, which governed the Autonomous Governorate of Estonia between 1917 and 1919; he was then elected to the newly formed Republic of Estonia's Asutav Kogu (Constituent Assembly), serving for the whole term (1919–20) as a member of the Estonian Labour Party. He also was Minister of Food from 26 October 1920 to 25 January 1921 before later serving as a long-time member of the Harju County government.

== Fate ==
Most authorities, including official Estonian government databases, give Johanson's death as having occurred in Nazi Germany in 1939. However, this account is contradicted by contemporary postwar Estonian émigré sources which provide evidence that he may have survived until 1951. In March 1950, it was reported that the German committee of the World Association of Estonians, which was then in the process of being established, was to include, among others, former career ambassador Johannes Markus, former Education Minister Jüri Annusson, and Peet Johanson. Obituaries published in early 1951 subsequently reported that Johanson had died on 9 January 1951 in Celle, West Germany. According to these sources, Johanson had been paralyzed and lost the ability to speak as a result of the March 1944 bombing of Tallinn. They further stated that his body was cremated in accordance with his wishes, with his ashes to be scattered beside his daughter's grave in Rahumäe Cemetery.

== Family ==
Johanson had a wife named Anna Eugenie Latzky who outlived him, as well as an only daughter who passed away in 1940.
