= Võivaku =

Village in Estonia

- Village
- Location in Estonia
- Coordinates: 58°29′03″N 25°36′30″E
- Country: Estonia
- County: Viljandi County
- Municipality: Põhja-Sakala Parish

Population (2015)
  - Total: 101

Võivaku is a village in Põhja-Sakala Parish, Viljandi County, located 13 km (8.1 mi) north of the town of Viljandi, 8.8 km (5.5 mi) north of the small borough of Olustvere and 10 km (6.2 mi) southwest of the town of Suure-Jaani. The population of Võivaku as of 2015 was 101, a decrease from 106 in the 2000 census.
