= Navesti =

Village in Estonia

- Village
- Location in Estonia
- Coordinates: 58°34′55″N 25°31′52″E
- Country: Estonia
- County: Viljandi County
- Municipality: Põhja-Sakala Parish
- First mentioned: 1599

Area
  - Total: 12.54 km^{2} (4.84 sq mi)

Population (01.01.2012)
  - Total: 98
  - Density: 7.8/km^{2} (20/sq mi)

Navesti (German: Nawwast) is a village in Põhja-Sakala Parish, Viljandi County in central Estonia. It is located on the road between the towns of Võhma and Suure-Jaani, about 6 km from each, where the road crosses the Navesti River. Navesti village has a population of 98 (as of 1 January 2012) and an area of 12.54 km².

The Türi–Viljandi railway passes through the village on its eastern side. The nearest station is in the small borough of Olustvere about 4 km southeast.

Navesti was first mentioned in 1599 as Navosth when the Navesti Manor belonged under the Pärsti Manor. In 1622 the Swedish king Gustav II Adolph gifted both manors to the brothers Casper, Fabian and Michael Engelhardts.

The site of the ancient pass over the Navesti River which connected the ancient counties of Sakala and Järvamaa is located in the village.
