= EPRA =

EPRA or Epra may refer to:

- Energy and Petroleum Regulatory Authority, a Kenyan independent regulatory authority responsible for technical and economic regulation of electricity, petroleum and renewable energy subsectors
- Epra, a village in Põhja-Sakala Parish, Viljandi County, Estonia
- European Public Real Estate Association, a non-profit association representing Europe's publicly listed property companies
- EPRA, the ICAO airport code for Warsaw Radom Airport, Poland
- Energy Permitting Reform Act of 2024, a proposed American law
