= Kärevere =

Kärevere may refer to several places in Estonia:

- Kärevere, Järva County, village in Türi Parish, Järva County
- Kärevere, Tartu County, village in Laeva Parish, Tartu County
- Kärevere, Viljandi County, village in Suure-Jaani Parish, Viljandi County
