= Loopre =

Loopre may refer to several places in Estonia:

- Loopre, Jõgeva County, village in Põltsamaa Parish, Jõgeva County
- Loopre, Viljandi County, village in Põhja-Sakala Parish, Viljandi County
