= Päraküla, Viljandi County =

Village in Estonia

Päraküla
- Village
- Location in Estonia
- Coordinates: 58°32′45″N 25°27′28″E
- Country: Estonia
- County: Viljandi County
- Municipality: Põhja-Sakala Parish

Population (2009)
  - Total: 107

Päraküla is a village in Põhja-Sakala Parish, Viljandi County in central Estonia. It has a population of 107 (as of 2009).
