= Lahmuse =

Village in Estonia

- village
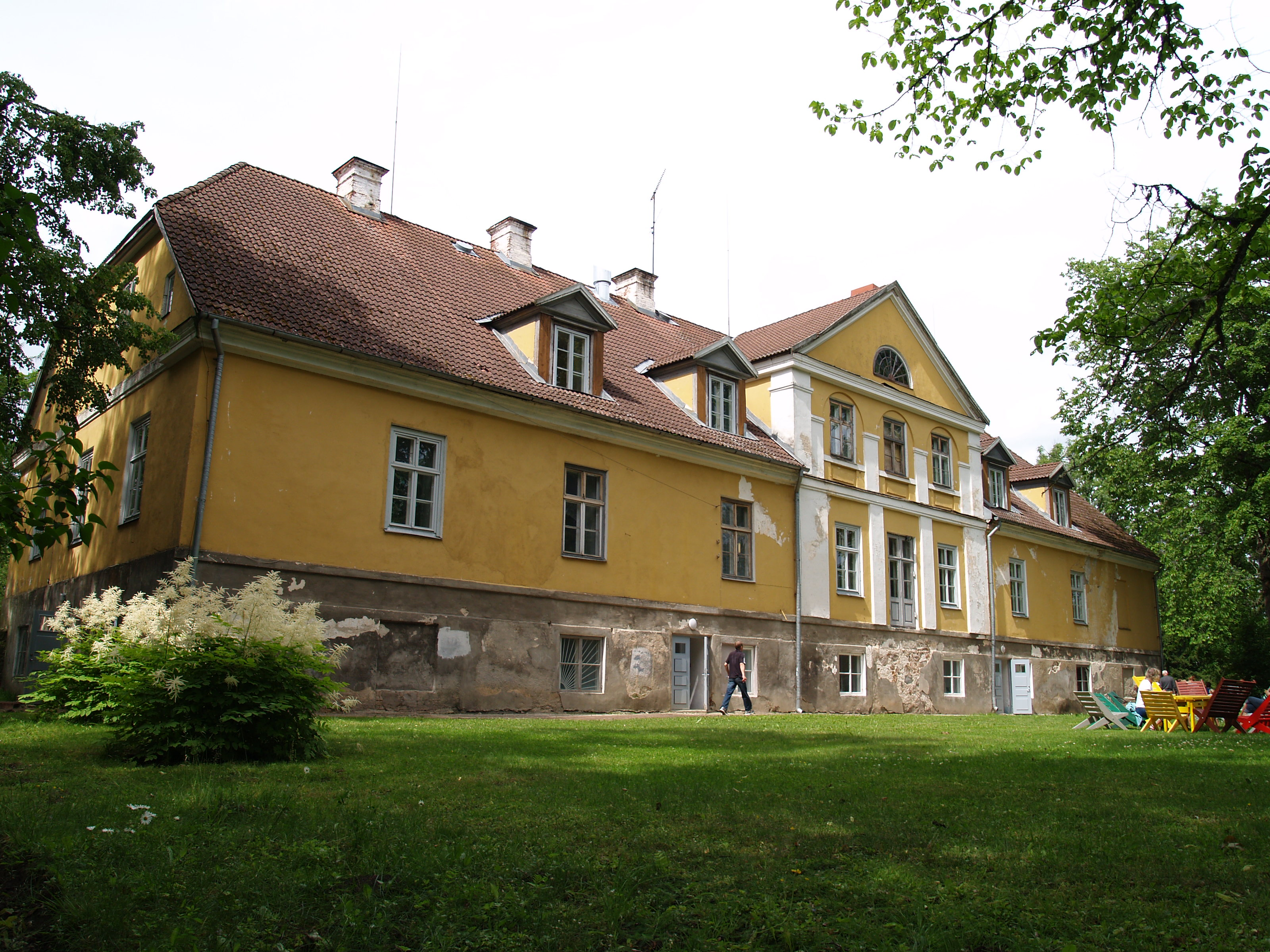
- Lahmuse manor

- Location in Estonia
- Coordinates: 58°33′26″N 25°26′50″E
- Country: Estonia
- County: Viljandi County
- Municipality: Põhja-Sakala Parish

Lahmuse is a village in Põhja-Sakala Parish, Viljandi County, Estonia.

== Lahmuse manor ==
Lahmuse estate (German: Lachmes) dates from at least 1593, when it belonged to the Trojanowski family. It subsequently belonged to different local aristocrats until the land reform following Estonia's declaration of independence in 1919. The main building today houses the village school, while the preserved outbuildings are private property.

The main building dates from 1837 to 1838 and displays a style of neoclassicism that is typical for manor houses in the area from about the same time.

== See also ==
- List of palaces and manor houses in Estonia
