= Jaska, Estonia =

Village in Estonia

Jaska
- Village
- Location in Estonia
- Coordinates: 58°31′53″N 25°34′47″E
- Country: Estonia
- County: Viljandi County
- Municipality: Põhja-Sakala Parish

Population (2009)
  - Total: 102

Jaska (German: Jaskamois) is a village in Põhja-Sakala Parish, Viljandi County in central Estonia. It has a population of 102 (as of 2009).
