= Venevere, Viljandi County =

Village in Estonia

Venevere
- Village
- Location in Estonia
- Coordinates: 58°36′11″N 25°43′26″E
- Country: Estonia
- County: Viljandi County
- Municipality: Põhja-Sakala Parish

Population (2011 Census)
  - Total: 44

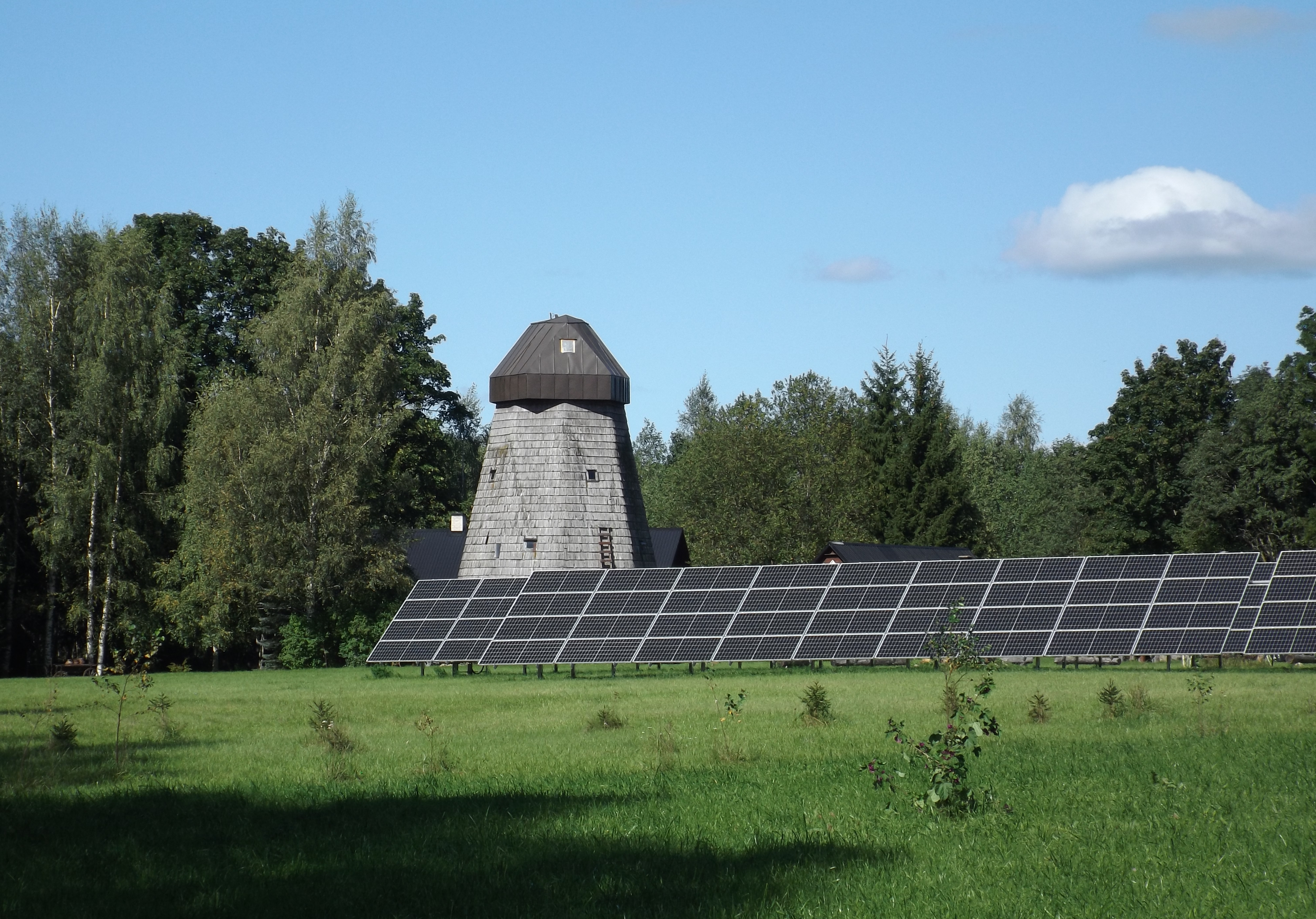
Windmill in Venevere village, Põhja-Sakala Parish.

Venevere is a village in Põhja-Sakala Parish, Viljandi County, in central Estonia. As of the 2011 census, the settlement's population was 44.
