= Maalasti =

Village in Estonia

- Village
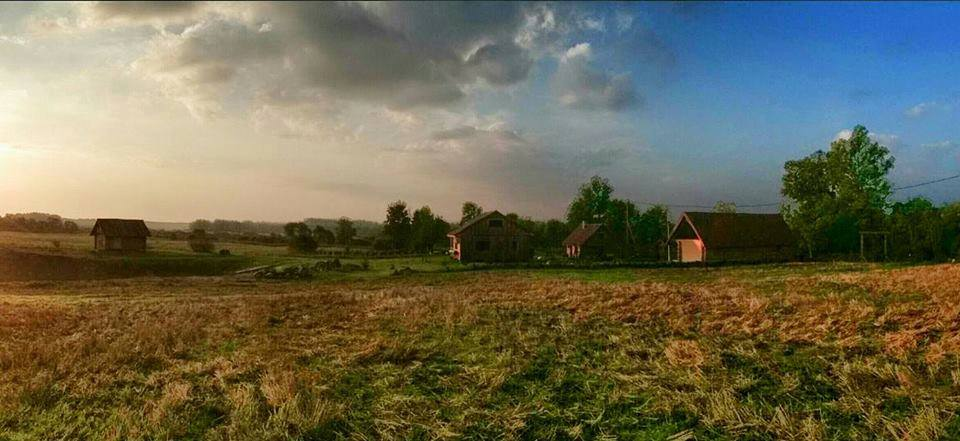

- Location in Estonia
- Coordinates: 58°35′40″N 25°40′12″E
- Country: Estonia
- County: Viljandi County
- Municipality: Põhja-Sakala Parish

Population (2011 Census)
  - Total: 9

Maalasti is a village in Põhja-Sakala Parish, Viljandi County, in central Estonia. As of the 2011 census, the settlement's population was 9.
