= Arjadi =

- Village
- Location within Estonia
- Coordinates: 58.5075°N 25.3975°E
- Country: Estonia
- County: Viljandi County
- Parish: Põhja-Sakala Parish
- Time zone: UTC+2 (EET)
  - Summer (DST): UTC+3 (EEST)

Arjadi is a village in Põhja-Sakala Parish, Viljandi County in Estonia.

A small Stream, which is called Arjadi Stream, flows through the village to the North.
