= Kirivere =

Village in Estonia

- Village
- Location in Estonia
- Coordinates: 58°39′08″N 25°42′52″E
- Country: Estonia
- County: Viljandi County
- Municipality: Põhja-Sakala Parish

Population (2011 Census)
  - Total: 55

Kirivere is a village in Põhja-Sakala Parish, Viljandi County, in central Estonia. As of the 2011 census, the settlement's population was 55.
