= Sandra, Estonia =

Village in Estonia

Sandra
- Village
- Location in Estonia
- Coordinates: 58°25′33″N 25°09′01″E
- Country: Estonia
- County: Viljandi County
- Municipality: Põhja-Sakala Parish

Area
  - Total: 173 km^{2} (67 sq mi)

Population (2009)
  - Total: 28
  - Density: 0.16/km^{2} (0.42/sq mi)

Sandra is a village in Põhja-Sakala Parish, Viljandi County, Estonia. It has a population of 28 (as of 2009). Sandra is located in the Soomaa National Park. Due to large wetland areas being included in its boundaries, Sandra is the largest village by area in Estonia with 173 km² (larger than the area of Tallinn).

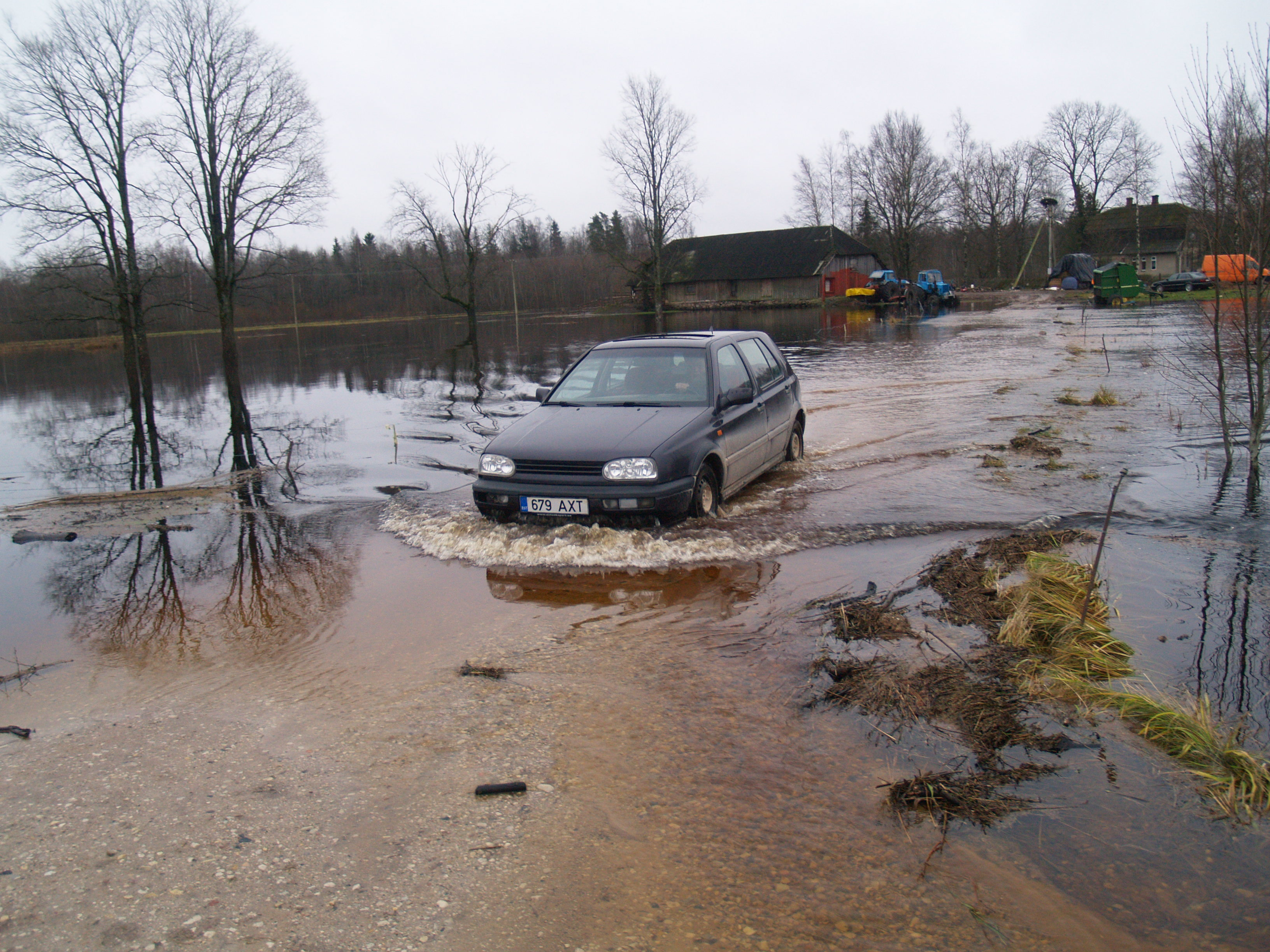
The "Fifth Season" characteristic to the Soomaa National Park in Kuusekäära, Sandra.
