= Vihi =

Village in Estonia

- Village
- Location in Estonia
- Coordinates: 58°34′41″N 25°23′01″E
- Country: Estonia
- County: Viljandi County
- Municipality: Põhja-Sakala Parish

Population (2009)
  - Total: 60

Vihi is a village in Põhja-Sakala Parish, Viljandi County in central Estonia, located by the Navesti River. It has a population of 60 (as of 2009).

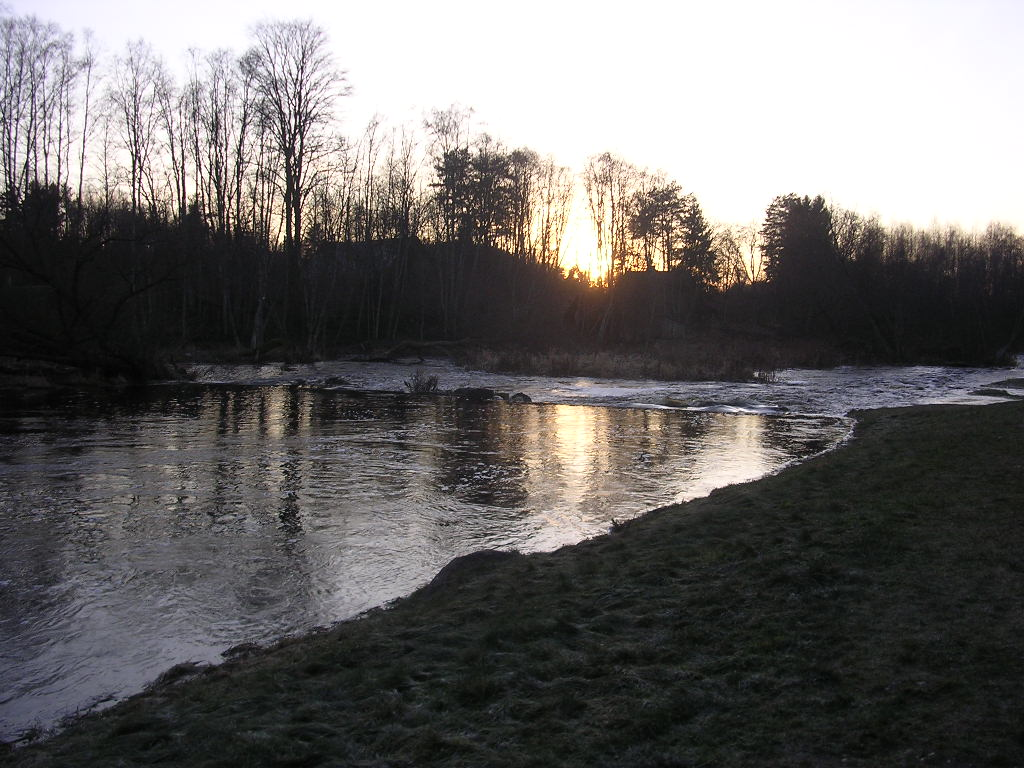
Navesti River in Vihi
