= Koksvere =

Village in Estonia

- Village
- Location in Estonia
- Coordinates: 58°37′36″N 25°38′32″E
- Country: Estonia
- County: Viljandi County
- Municipality: Põhja-Sakala Parish

Population (2011 Census)
  - Total: 180

Koksvere is a village in Põhja-Sakala Parish, Viljandi County, in central Estonia. As of the 2011 census, the settlement's population was 180.
