= Kangrussaare =

Village in Estonia

- Village
- Location in Estonia
- Coordinates: 58°36′43″N 25°43′33″E
- Country: Estonia
- County: Viljandi County
- Municipality: Põhja-Sakala Parish

Population (2011 Census)
  - Total: 34

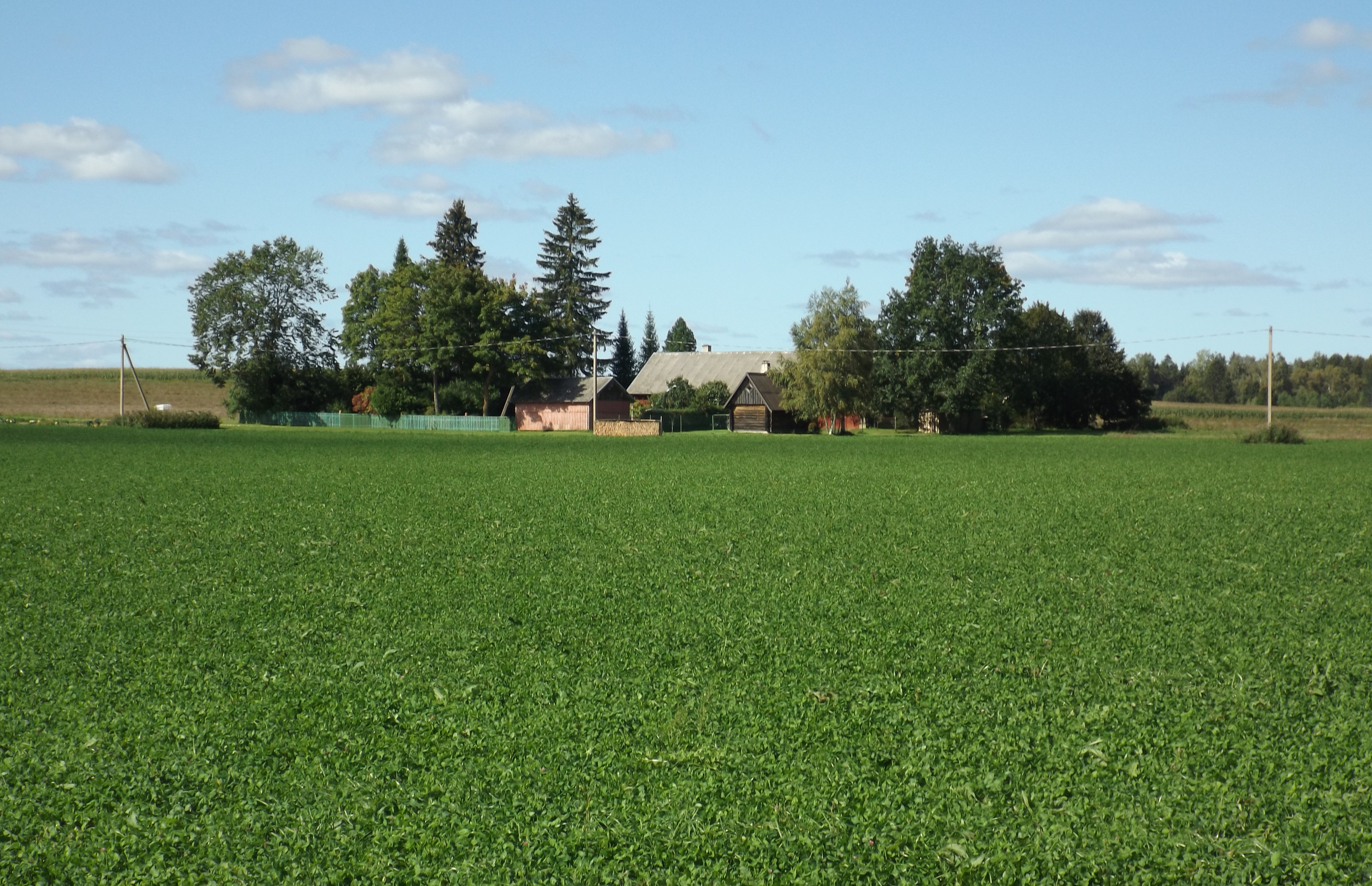
Homestead in Kangrussaare village, Põhja-Sakala Parish.

Kangrussaare is a village in Põhja-Sakala Parish, Viljandi County, in central Estonia. As of the 2011 census, the settlement's population was 34.
