= Kuhjavere =

Village in Estonia

- Village
- Location in Estonia
- Coordinates: 58°30′09″N 25°41′34″E
- Country: Estonia
- County: Viljandi County
- Municipality: Põhja-Sakala Parish

Population (2009)
  - Total: 68

Kuhjavere is a village in Põhja-Sakala Parish, Viljandi County in Estonia. It has a population of 68 (as of 2009).

The eastern part of the village is occupied by the Parika Bog which also includes several lakes like Parika Väikejärv.

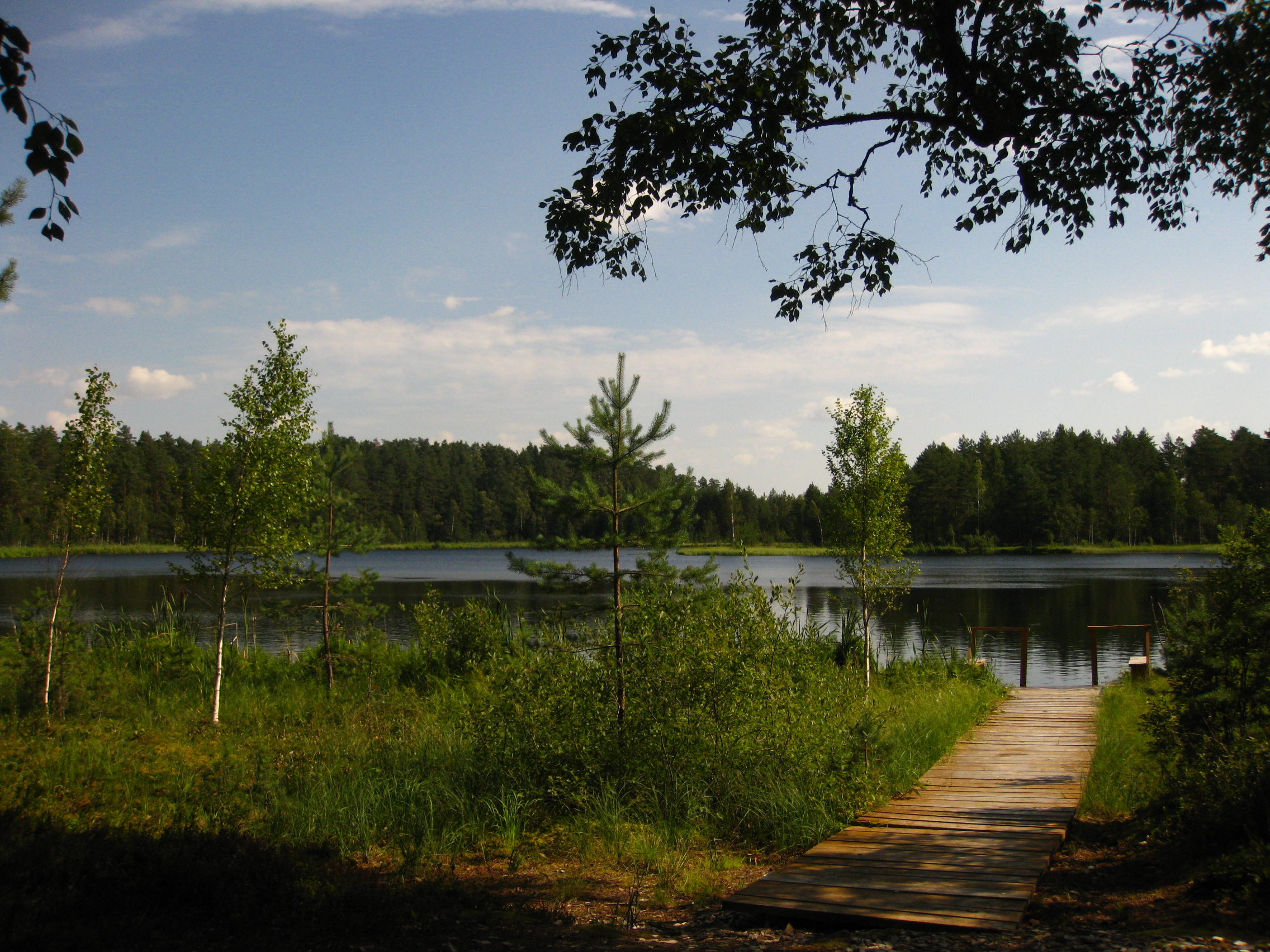
Parika Väikejärv in Kuhjavere.
