= Kerita, Estonia =

Village in Estonia

Kerita
- Village
- Location in Estonia
- Coordinates: 58°29′41″N 25°33′27″E
- Country: Estonia
- County: Viljandi County
- Municipality: Põhja-Sakala Parish

Population (2009)
  - Total: 65

Kerita is a village in Põhja-Sakala Parish, Viljandi County in central Estonia. It has a population of 65 (as of 2009).
