= Põhja-Sakala Parish =

Municipality of Estonia

Põhja-Sakala Parish Põhja-Sakala vald
- Municipality of Estonia
- Flag Coat of arms

- Põhja-Sakala Parish within Põhja-Sakala County
- Country: Estonia
- County: Viljandi County
- Administrative centre: Suure-Jaani

Area
  - Total: 1,153 km^{2} (445 sq mi)

Population (2019)
  - Total: 7,959
  - Density: 6.903/km^{2} (17.88/sq mi)
- ISO 3166 code: EE-615

Põhja-Sakala Parish (Estonian: Põhja-Sakala vald) is a rural municipality in Viljandi County.

== Settlements ==
Towns

Suure-Jaani, Võhma

Boroughs

Kõpu, Olustvere

Villages

Aimla, Ängi, Arjadi, Arjassaare, Arussaare, Epra, Iia, Ilbaku, Ivaski, Jälevere, Jaska, Kabila, Kangrussaare, Kärevere, Karjasoo, Kerita, Kibaru, Kildu, Kirivere, Kobruvere, Kõidama, Koksvere, Kõo, Kootsi, Kuhjavere, Kuiavere, Kuninga, Kurnuvere, Laane, Lahmuse, Lemmakõnnu, Lõhavere, Loopre, Maalasti, Mäeküla, Metsküla, Mudiste, Munsi, Navesti, Nuutre, Paaksima, Paelama, Paenasti, Pilistvere, Punaküla, Põhjaka, Päraküla, Rääka, Reegoldi, Riiassaare, Sandra, Saviaugu, Seruküla, Soomevere, Supsi, Sürgavere, Tääksi, Taevere, Tällevere, Tipu, Uia, Ülde, Unakvere, Vanaveski, Vastemõisa, Venevere, Vihi, Võhmassaare, Võivaku, Võlli

== Religion ==
Religion in Põhja-Sakala Parish (2021)
1. Unaffiliated (86.4%)
2. Lutheran (7.90%)
3. Orthodox (2.10%)
4. Other Christians (0.70%)
5. Other religions (0.70%)
6. Unknown (2.20%)

== Notable people ==
- Johann Köler (1826 in Ivaski – 1899), leader of the Estonian national awakening and a painter
- Peet Johanson (1881 in Sürgavere – 1939), farmer and politician, Minister of Food, 1920 to 1921
- Mart Saar (1882 in Hüpassaare – 1963), composer, organist and collector of folk songs.
- Jaan Piiskar (1883 in Vastemõisa – 1942), educator and politician; Minister of Education and Social Affairs, 1931 to 1932
- Hans Kalm (1889 in Kõo – 1981), soldier, homeopath and naturopath
- Tõnis Kint (1896 in Paasioja – 1991), acting Prime Minister of the Estonian Government in Exile, 1963-1970
- Jüri Looväli (1897 in Vastemõisa – 1963), politician, governor of Pärnu County, 1941 to 1944
- Roman Toi (1916 in Kõo – 2018), composer, choir conductor and organist; his music is melodic, lyrical, and melancholic.
- Margus Tammekivi (1956 in Kõpu – 2026), lawyer, politician; chairman of the Pärnu Council, 1989 to 1993, and 2002 to 2005
- Tuuli Vahtra (born 1989 in Kõo), chess player, she won the FIDE title of Woman FIDE Master in 2009.
