= Võlli, Viljandi County =

Village in Estonia

Võlli
- Village
- Location in Estonia
- Coordinates: 58°30′37″N 25°20′33″E
- Country: Estonia
- County: Viljandi County
- Municipality: Põhja-Sakala Parish

Population (2009)
  - Total: 55

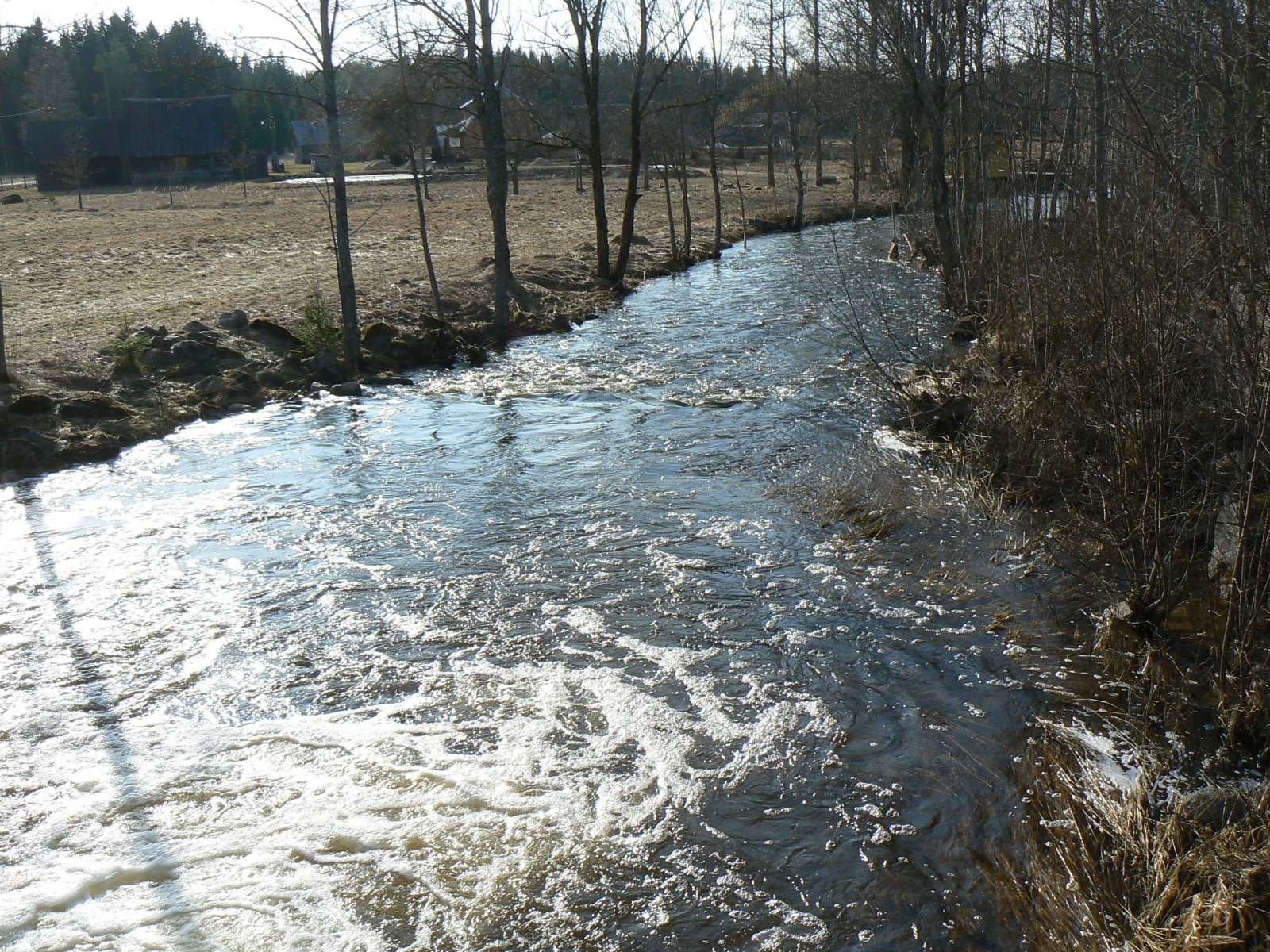
Lemmjõgi river at Võlli village, Estonia

Võlli is a village in Põhja-Sakala Parish, Viljandi County in central Estonia. It has a population of 55 (as of 2009).
