= Kobruvere =

Village in Estonia

- Village
- Location within Estonia
- Coordinates: 58.4625°N 25.446666666667°E
- Country: Estonia
- County: Viljandi County
- Parish: Põhja-Sakala Parish
- Time zone: UTC+2 (EET)
  - Summer (DST): UTC+3 (EEST)

Kobruvere is a village in Põhja-Sakala Parish, Viljandi County in Estonia.
