= Metsküla, Viljandi County =

Village in Estonia

Metsküla
- Village
- Location in Estonia
- Coordinates: 58°24′21″N 25°25′03″E
- Country: Estonia
- County: Viljandi County
- Municipality: Põhja-Sakala Parish

Population (2009)
  - Total: 196

Metsküla is a village in Põhja-Sakala Parish, Viljandi County in central Estonia. It has a population of 196 (as of 2009). Prior to the 2017 administrative reform of local governments, it was located in Orava Parish.

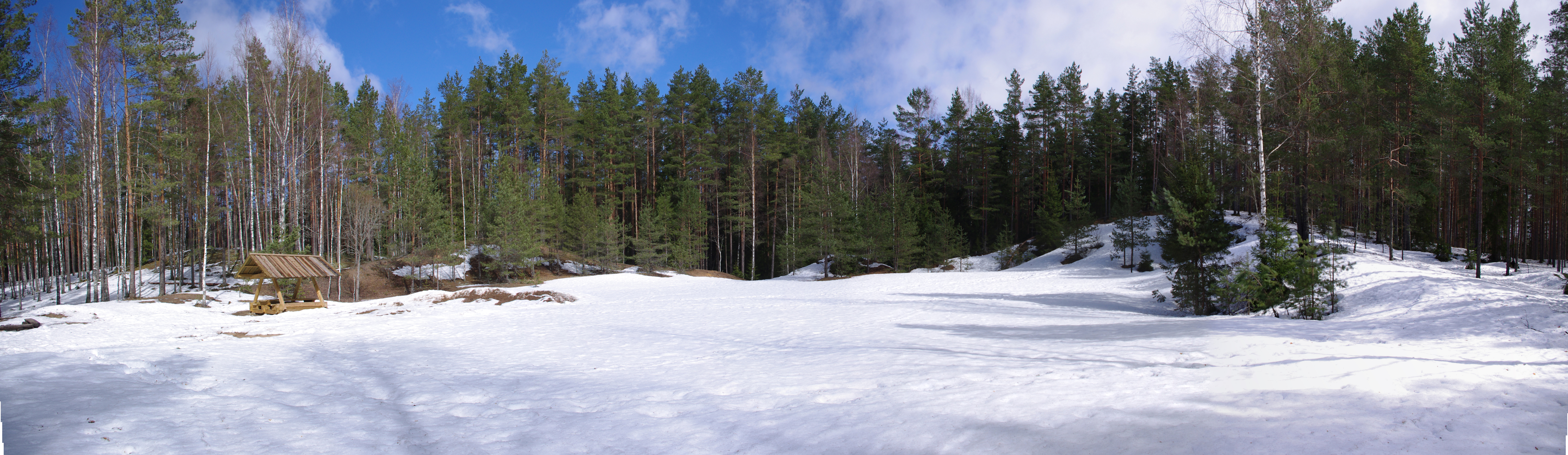
Ruunaraipe dunes in Metsküla.
