= Kabila, Viljandi County =

Village in Estonia

Kabila
- Village
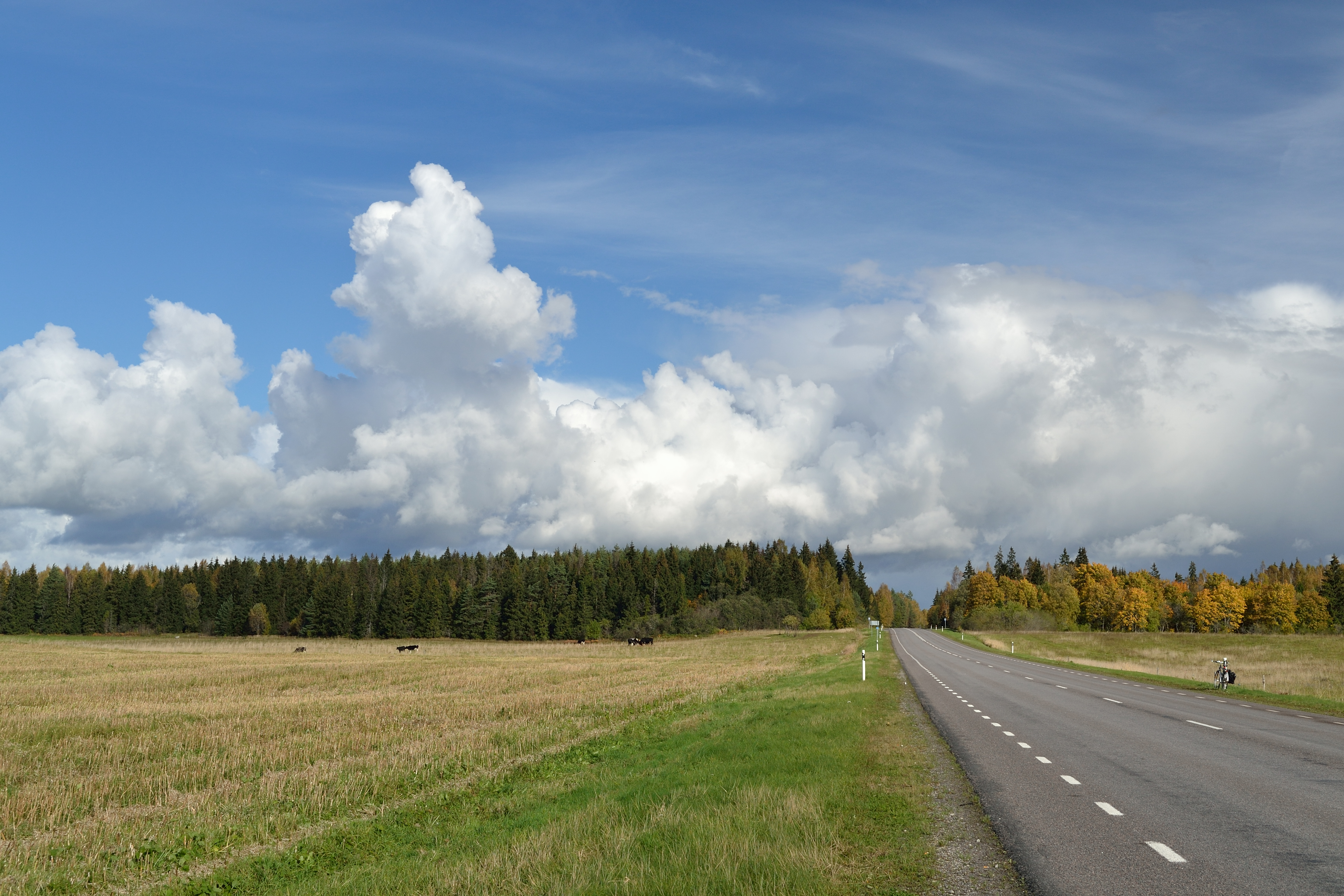
- Ääsmäe–Haapsalu road in Kabila

- Location in Estonia
- Coordinates: 58°28′25″N 25°29′05″E
- Country: Estonia
- County: Viljandi County
- Municipality: Põhja-Sakala Parish

Population (2009)
  - Total: 78

Kabila is a village in Põhja-Sakala Parish, Viljandi County in central Estonia. It has a population of 78 (as of 2009).
