= Aimla, Estonia =

- Village
- Location within Estonia
- Coordinates: 58.485833333333°N 25.710833333333°E
- Country: Estonia
- County: Viljandi County
- Parish: Põhja-Sakala Parish
- Time zone: UTC+2 (EET)
  - Summer (DST): UTC+3 (EEST)

Aimla (German: Aimel) is a village in Põhja-Sakala Parish, Viljandi County in Estonia.
