= Paenasti =

Village in Estonia

- Village
- Location in Estonia
- Coordinates: 58°35′20″N 25°47′13″E
- Country: Estonia
- County: Viljandi County
- Municipality: Põhja-Sakala Parish

Population (2011 Census)
  - Total: 31

Paenasti (German: Pajusby) is a village in Põhja-Sakala Parish, Viljandi County, in central Estonia. As of the 2011 census, the settlement's population was 31.
