= Arussaare =

Village in Estonia

- Village
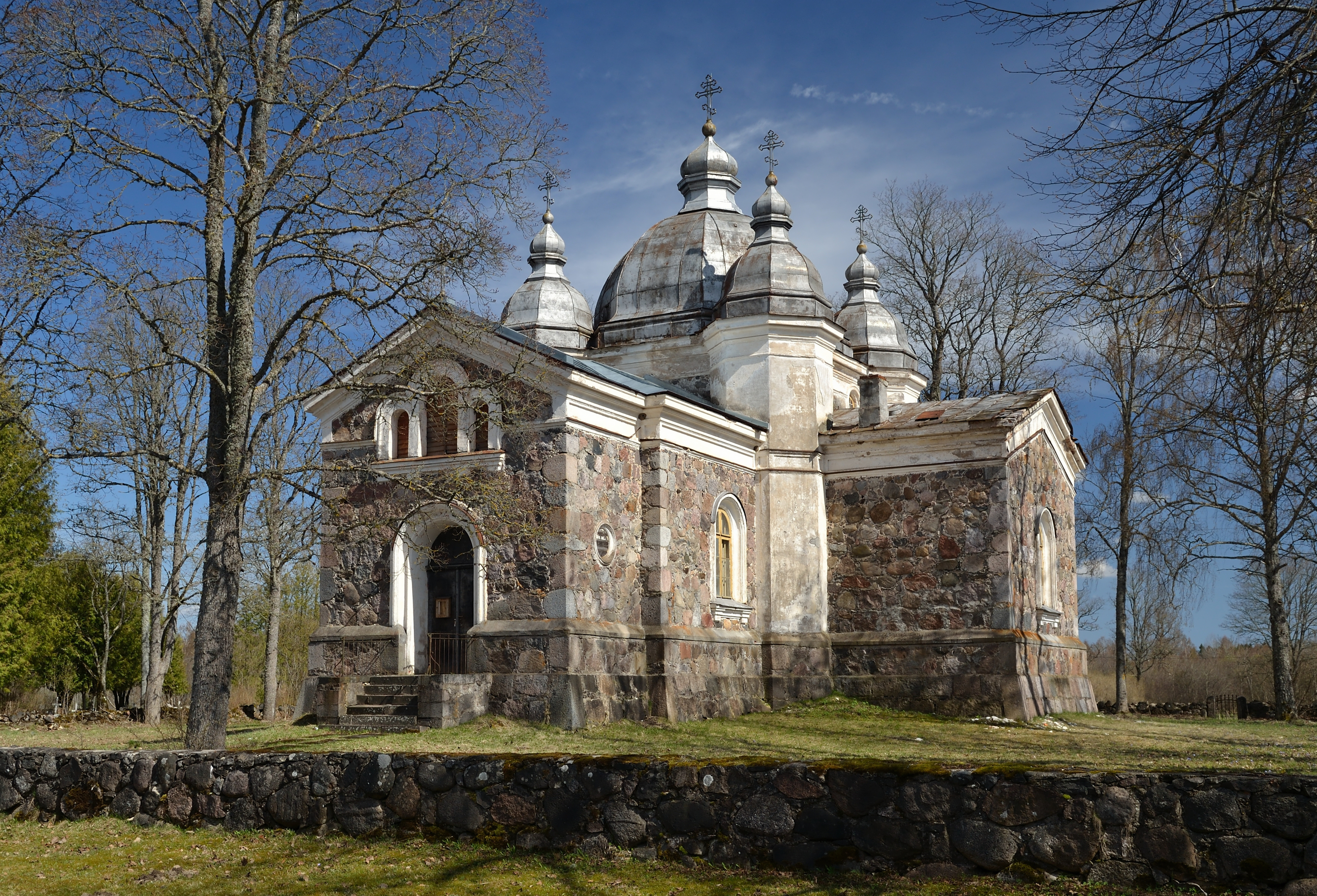
- Arussaare Ascension of Christ's Orthodox Church

- Location in Estonia
- Coordinates: 58°38′17″N 25°40′43″E
- Country: Estonia
- County: Viljandi County
- Municipality: Põhja-Sakala Parish

Population (2011 Census)
  - Total: 51

Arussaare (seldom written as Arusaare; German: Arrosaar) is a village in Põhja-Sakala Parish, Viljandi County, in central Estonia. It lies on the Põltsamaa–Võhma road (no. 38), about 6.5 km (4 mi) east of Võhma, on the right bank of the Retla River. At the 2011 Census, the settlement's population was 51.

Arussaare has been the location of the Arussaare state manor (Arrosaar). In 1854, the granary of the manor was given to local Orthodox congregation. Between 1871 and 1873, a new stone church was built on the site of the manor, and was dedicated to the Ascension of Christ. In 1920, a new cemetery was established beside the church.

The northern part of the village contains an ancient offering stone and an offering spring, Uduallikas ("Fog Spring").

== Gallery ==
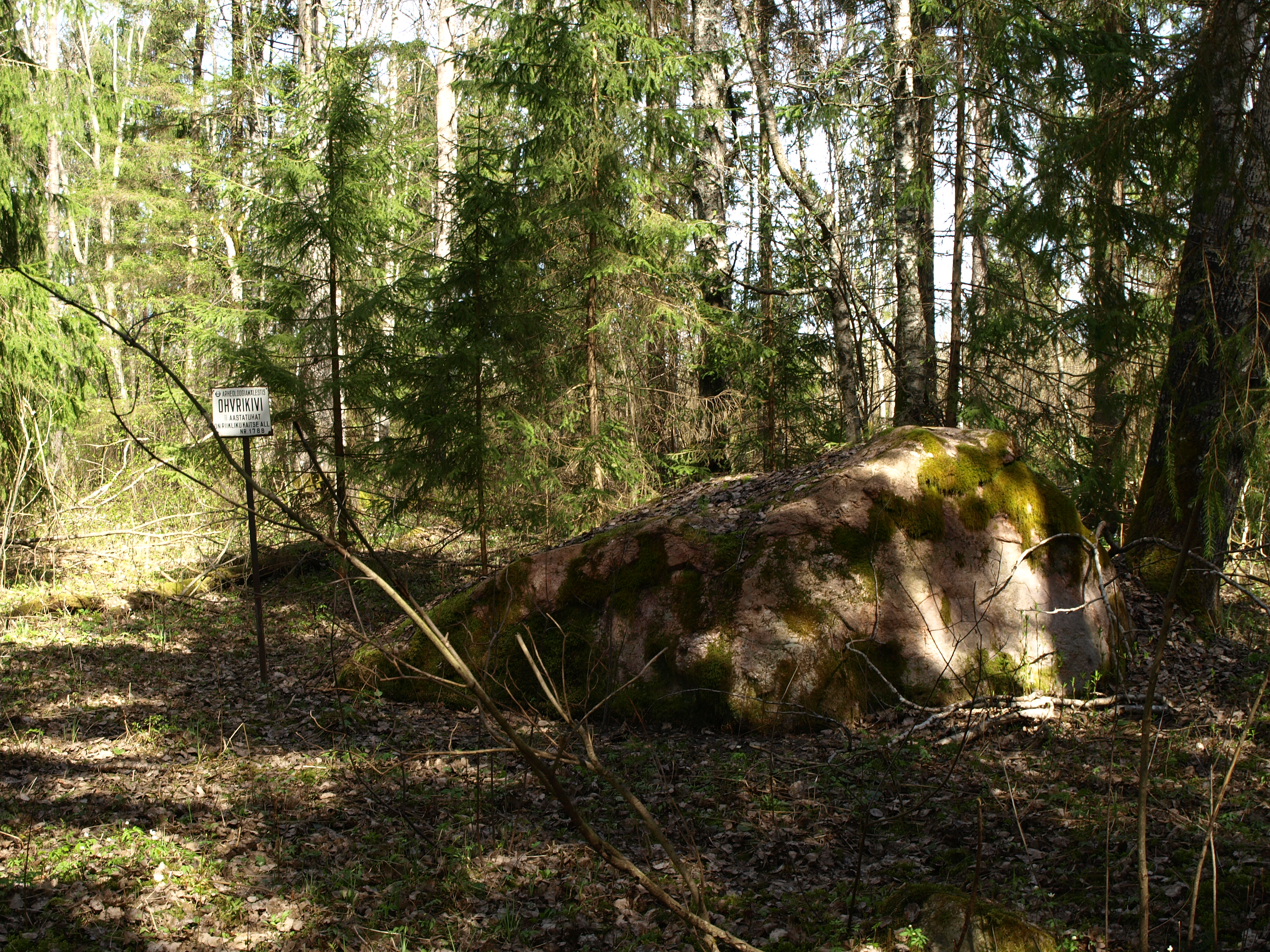
Offering stone

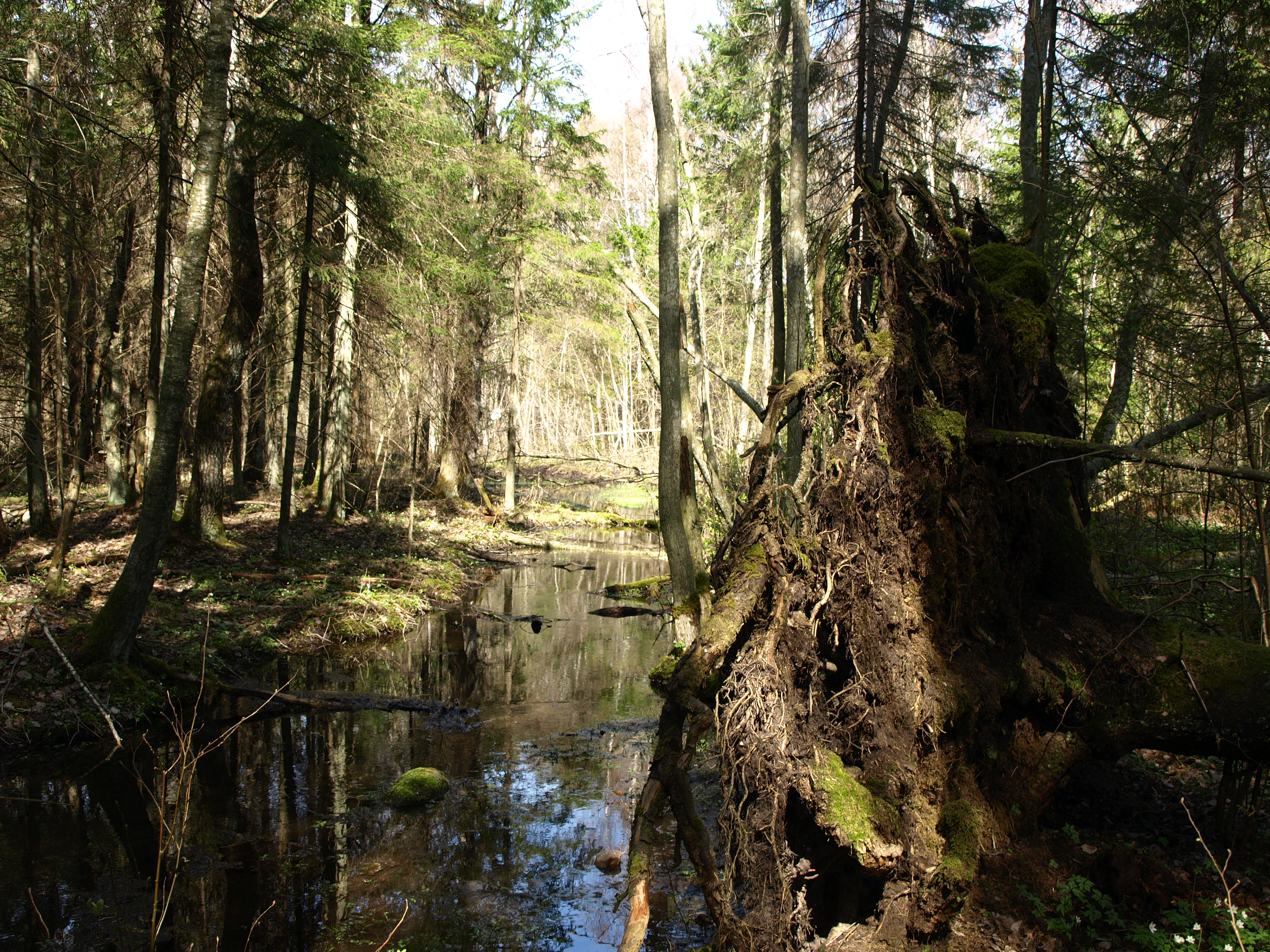
Offering spring Uduallikas.
