= Mäeküla, Põhja-Sakala Parish =

Village in Estonia

Mäeküla
- Village
- Location in Estonia
- Coordinates: 58°29′41″N 25°37′30″E
- Country: Estonia
- County: Viljandi County
- Municipality: Põhja-Sakala Parish

Population (2009)
  - Total: 52

Mäeküla is a village in Põhja-Sakala Parish, Viljandi County in central Estonia. It has a population of 52 (as of 2009).
