= Kärevere, Viljandi County =

Village in Estonia

Kärevere
- Village
- Location in Estonia
- Coordinates: 58°32′28″N 25°31′45″E
- Country: Estonia
- County: Viljandi County
- Municipality: Põhja-Sakala Parish

Population (2009)
  - Total: 48

Kärevere (German: Kerrafer) is a village in Põhja-Sakala Parish, Viljandi County in central Estonia. It has a population of 48 (as of 2009).

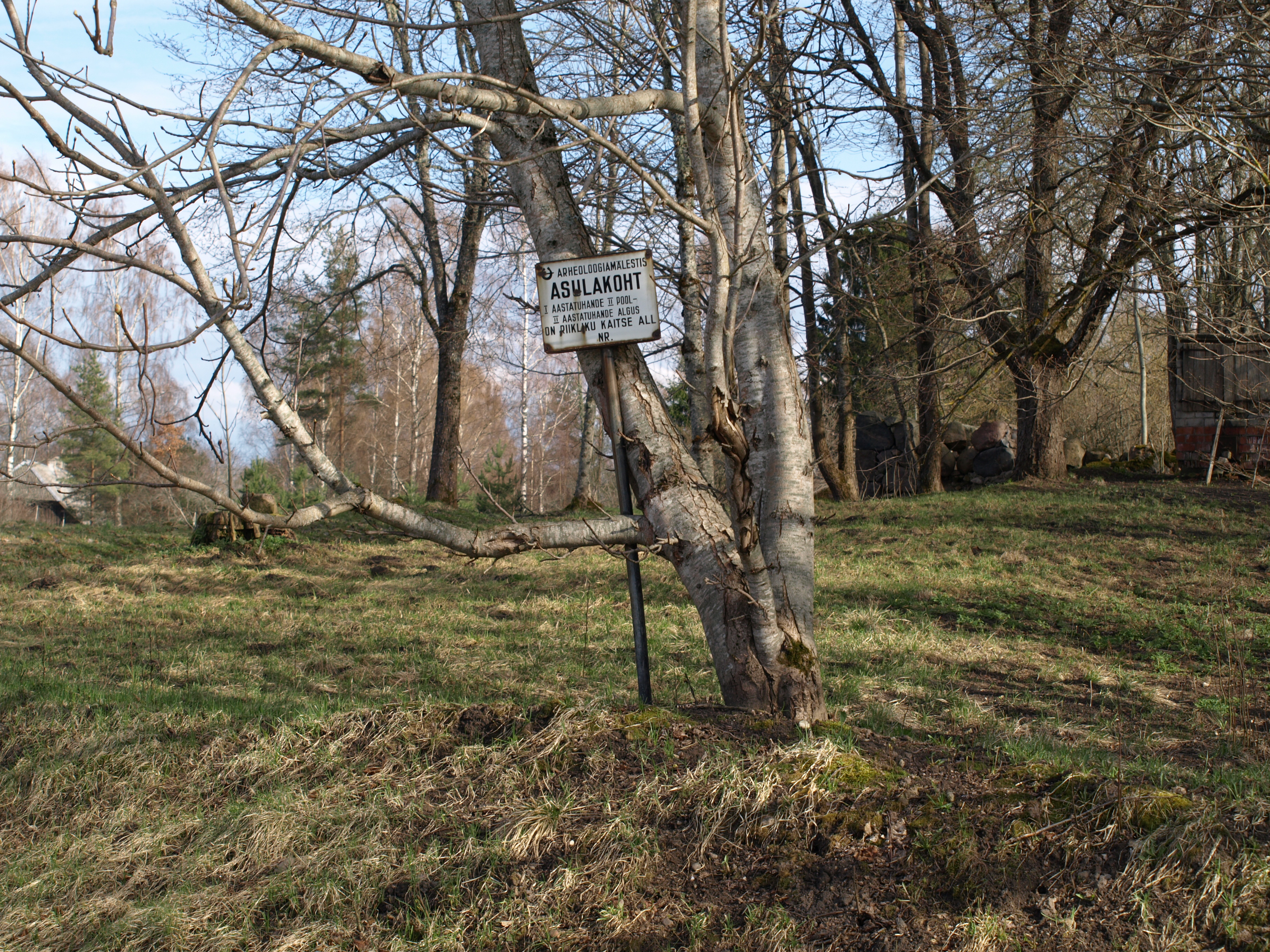
Ancient settlement in Kärevere.
