= Loopre, Viljandi County =

Village in Estonia

Loopre
- Village
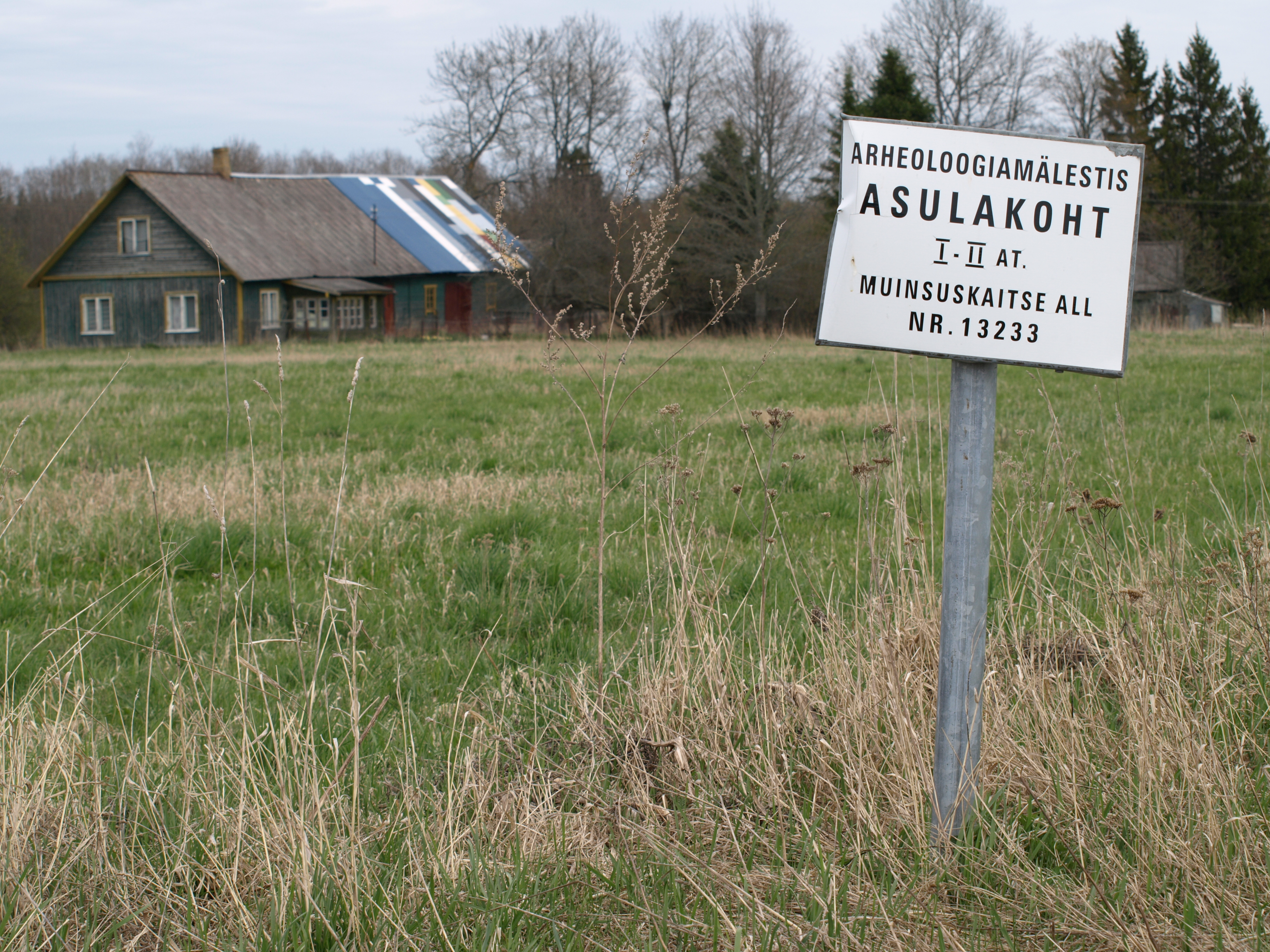
- Loopre in 2012

- Location in Estonia
- Coordinates: 58°38′09″N 25°46′29″E
- Country: Estonia
- County: Viljandi County
- Municipality: Põhja-Sakala Parish

Population (2011 Census)
  - Total: 46

Loopre (German: Loper) is a village in Põhja-Sakala Parish, Viljandi County, in central Estonia. As of the 2011 census, the settlement's population was 46.
