= Laane, Viljandi County =

Village in Estonia

Laane
- Village
- Location in Estonia
- Coordinates: 58°21′01″N 25°16′09″E
- Country: Estonia
- County: Viljandi County
- Municipality: Põhja-Sakala Parish

Population (2002)
  - Total: 25

Laane is a village in Põhja-Sakala Parish, Viljandi County, Estonia. It has a population of 25 (as of 2002).
