= Iia, Estonia =

Village in Estonia

Iia
- Village
- Location in Estonia
- Coordinates: 58°20′03″N 25°11′26″E
- Country: Estonia
- County: Viljandi County
- Municipality: Põhja-Sakala Parish

Population (2011 Census)
  - Total: 23

Iia is a village in Põhja-Sakala Parish, Viljandi County in Estonia. As of the 2011 census, the settlement's population was 23.

The northern half of the village's territory is covered by the Ördi Bog, which is located in the Soomaa National Park.

== Gallery ==
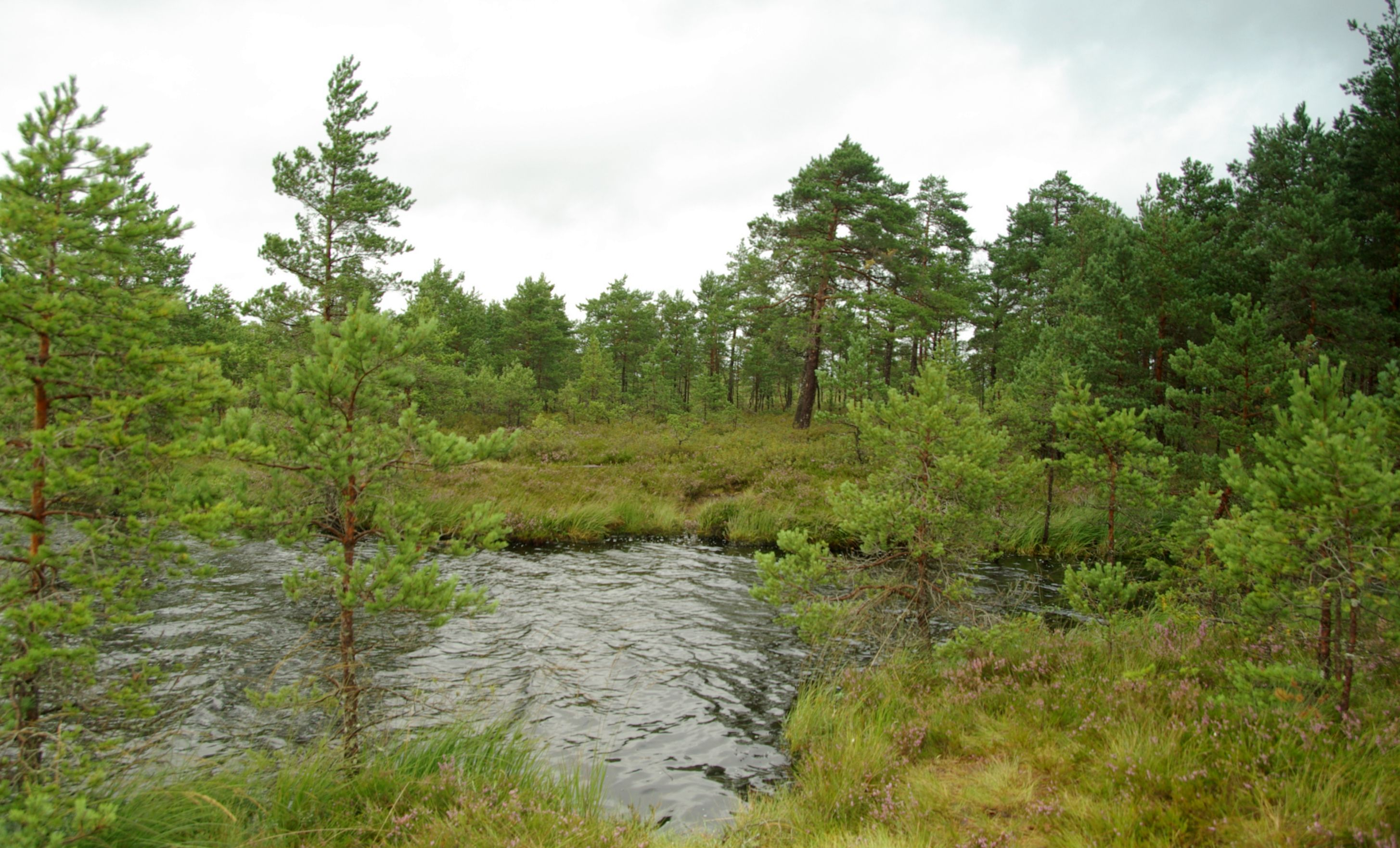
Ördi bog

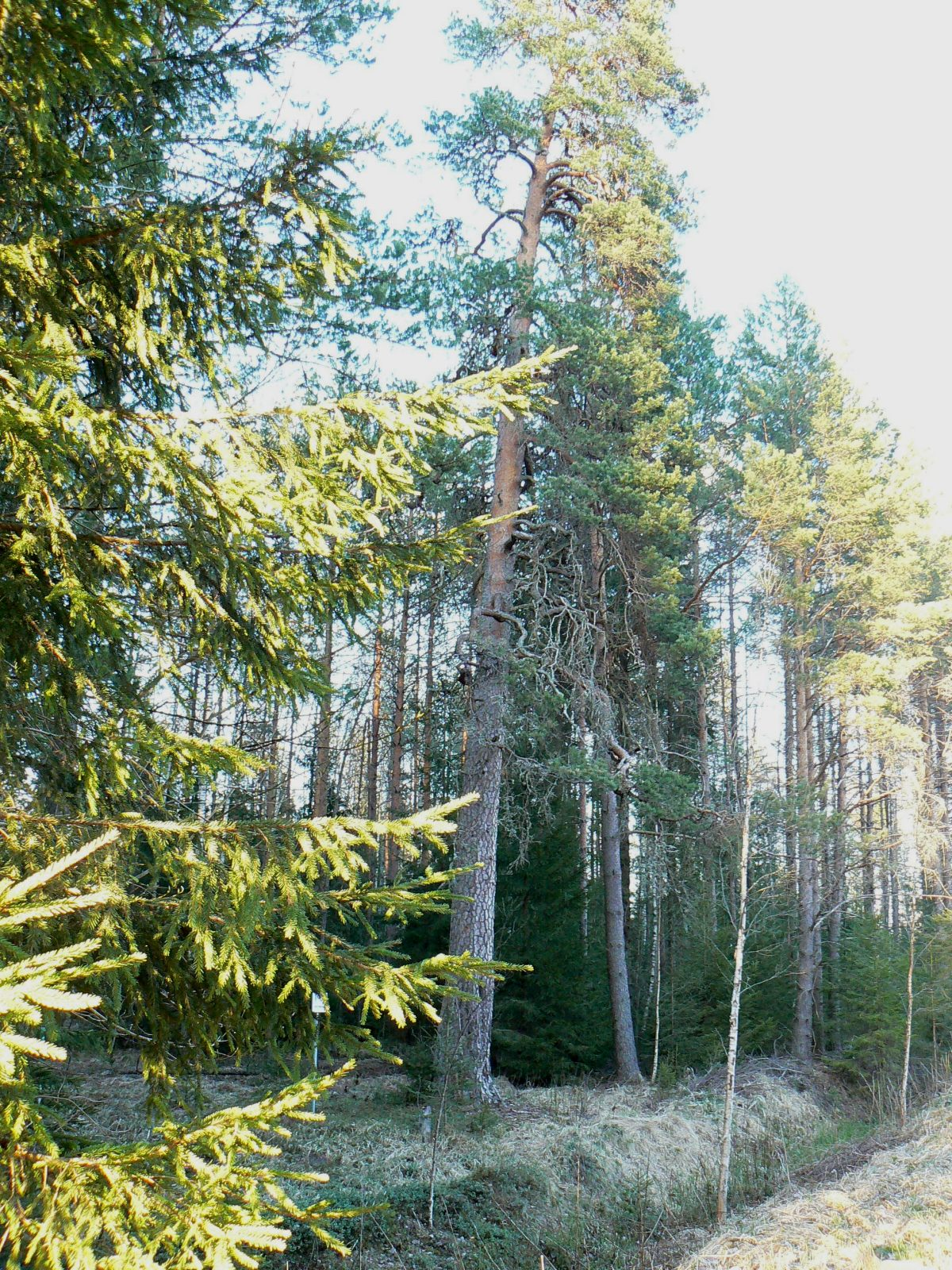
The Iia ristimänd (Iia cross pine)
