= Sürgavere =

Village in Estonia

- Village
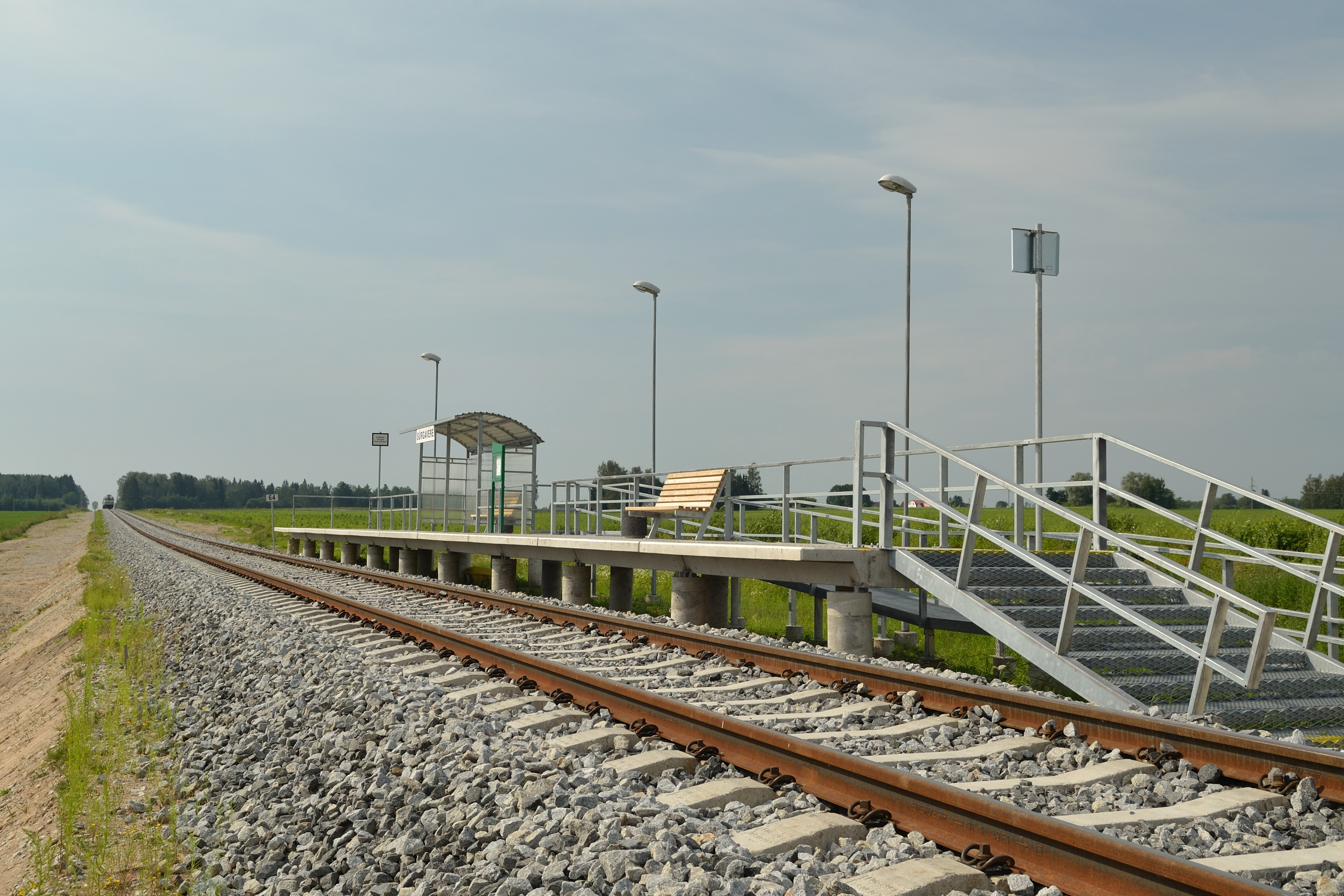
- Sürgavere train station

- Location in Estonia
- Coordinates: 58°29′13″N 25°30′59″E
- Country: Estonia
- County: Viljandi County
- Municipality: Põhja-Sakala Parish

Population (2009)
  - Total: 398

Sürgavere (German: Surgefer) is a village in Põhja-Sakala Parish, Viljandi County in central Estonia. It has a population of 398 (as of 2009).

It has a station on the Tallinn - Viljandi railway line operated by Elron.
