= Tipu, Estonia =

Village in Estonia

Tipu
- Village
- Location in Estonia
- Coordinates: 58°21′38″N 25°04′55″E
- Country: Estonia
- County: Viljandi County
- Municipality: Põhja-Sakala Parish

Population (2002)
  - Total: 38

Tipu is a village in Põhja-Sakala Parish, Viljandi County, Estonia. It has a population of 38 (as of 2002).

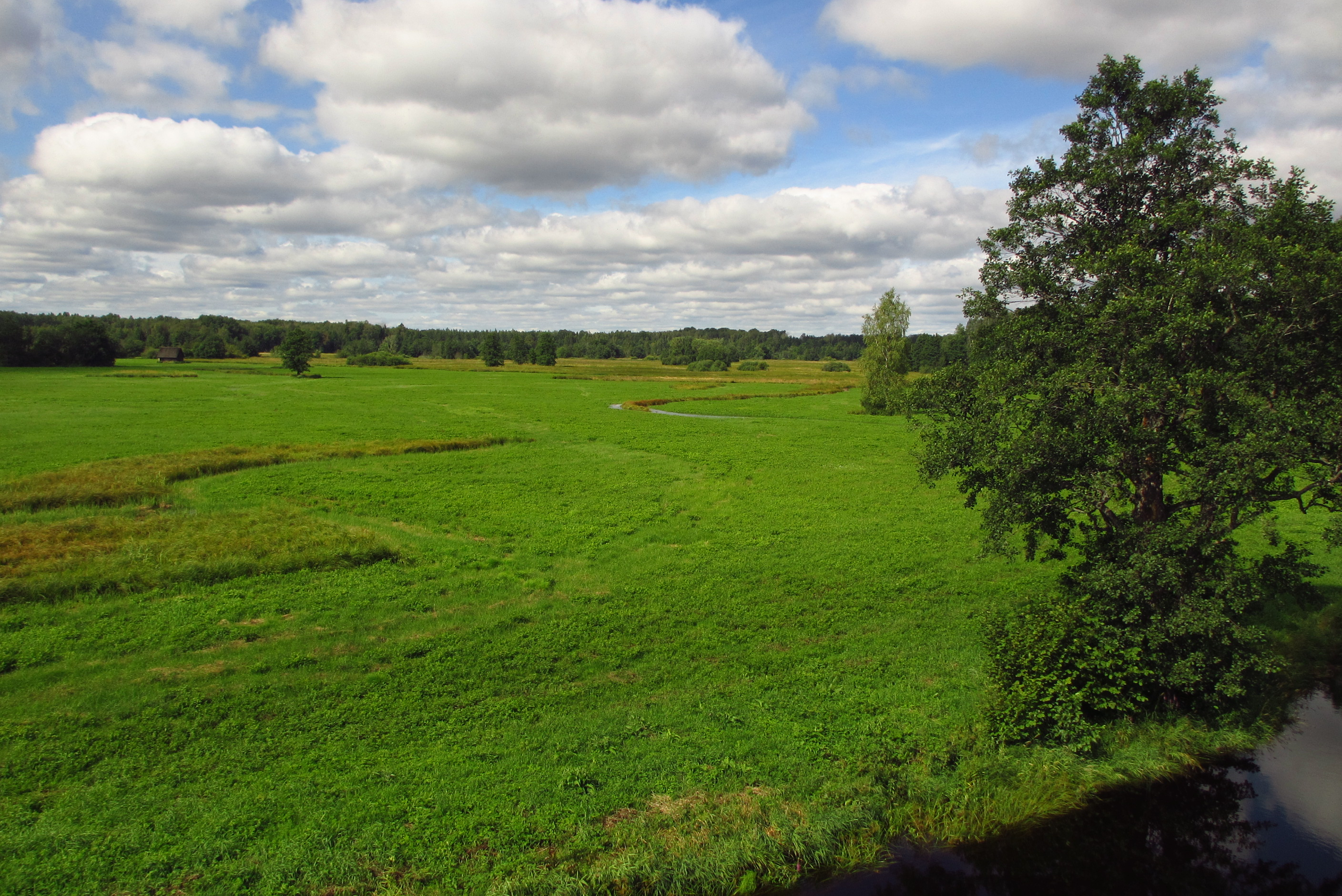
Läti flood-meadow by the Halliste River in Tipu.
