= Kuninga, Viljandi County =

Village in Estonia

Kuninga
- Village
- Location in Estonia
- Coordinates: 58°17′37″N 25°22′37″E
- Country: Estonia
- County: Viljandi County
- Municipality: Põhja-Sakala Parish

Population (2002)
  - Total: 15

Kuninga is a village in Põhja-Sakala Parish, Viljandi County, Estonia. It has a population of 15 (as of 2002).
