= Epra =

Village in Estonia

- Village
- Location in Estonia
- Coordinates: 58°30′41″N 25°26′43″E
- Country: Estonia
- County: Viljandi County
- Municipality: Põhja-Sakala Parish

Population (2009)
  - Total: 89

Epra is a village in Põhja-Sakala Parish, Viljandi County in central Estonia, located just south of the town of Suure-Jaani, the administrative centre of the municipality. It has a population of 89 (as of 2009).
