= Uia, Estonia =

Village in Estonia

Uia
- Village
- Location in Estonia
- Coordinates: 58°20′18″N 25°14′23″E
- Country: Estonia
- County: Viljandi County
- Municipality: Põhja-Sakala Parish

Population (2002)
  - Total: 63

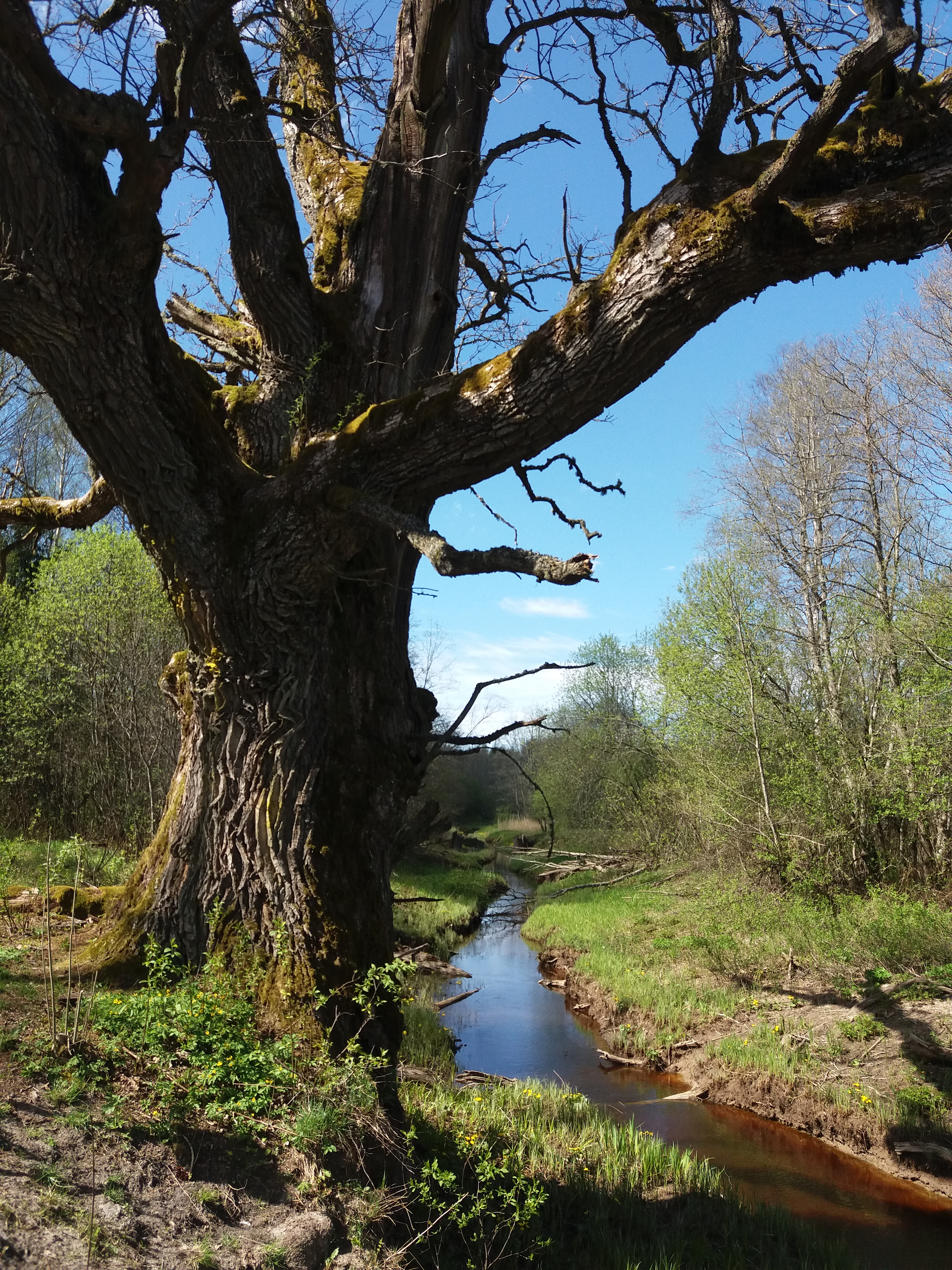

Uia is a village in Põhja-Sakala Parish, Viljandi County, Estonia. It has a population of 63 (as of 2002).
