= Olustvere =

Borough in Estonia

- Small borough
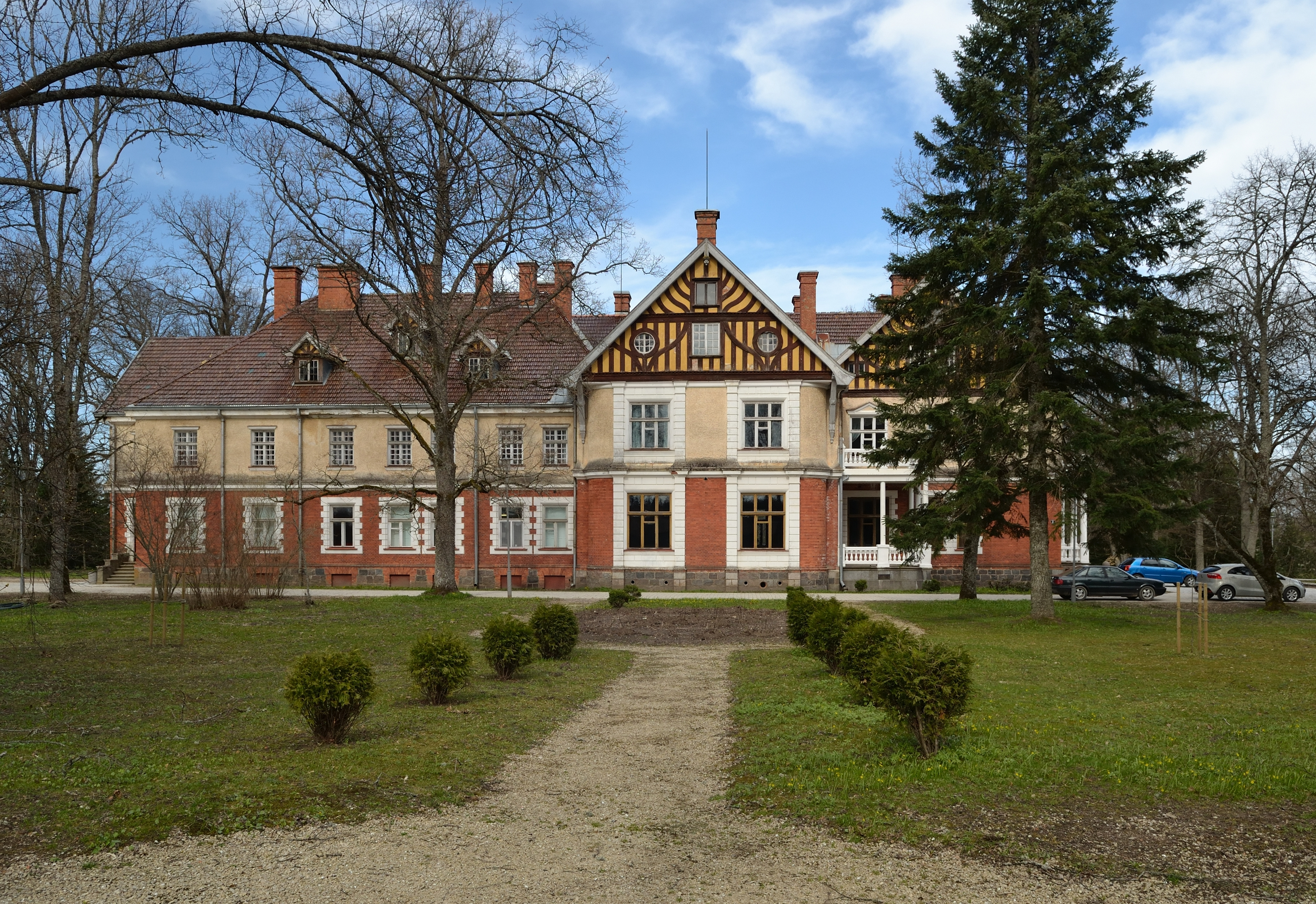
- Olustvere manor

- Location in Estonia
- Coordinates: 58°33′4″N 25°33′59″E
- Country: Estonia
- County: Viljandi County
- Municipality: Põhja-Sakala Parish

Population (2009)
  - Total: 465

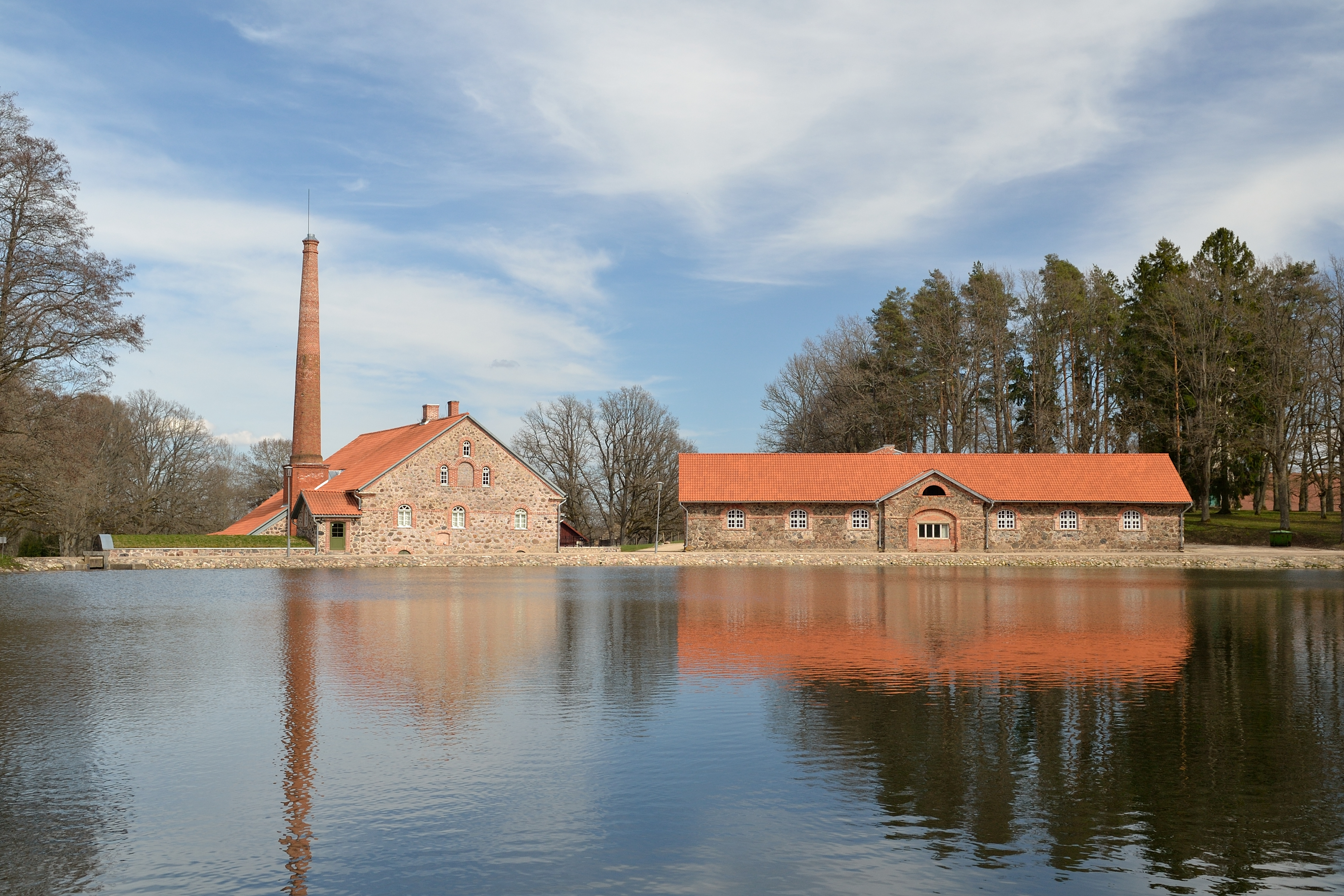
Manor distillery and ox stable

Olustvere (German: Ollustfer) is a small borough (Estonian: alevik) in Põhja-Sakala Parish, Viljandi County in central Estonia. It has a population of 465 (as of 2009).

During the 19th century and supposedly earlier, the area surrounding the Olustvere estate and its manor (supposedly established in the middle of the 16th century) was one of the commercial and social centres of the Põhja-Sakala Parish, at that time Gross-Sankt Johannis parish, in Livonia. In 1847, Sts. Peter and Paul Eastern Orthodox congregation was established at Olustvere (at that time Ollustfer) and a small church was built there in 1849. The congregation's cemetery was located at the nearby locality of Reegoldi. In the beginning of the 20th century, the congregation moved to Gross-St. Johannis, where a new church had been built and a new cemetery established.

Olustvere railway station was built in 1901, and is located on the Tallinn - Viljandi railway line operated by Elron (rail transit).

The present two-storey manor house in Olustvere was built in 1903.

== Gallery ==
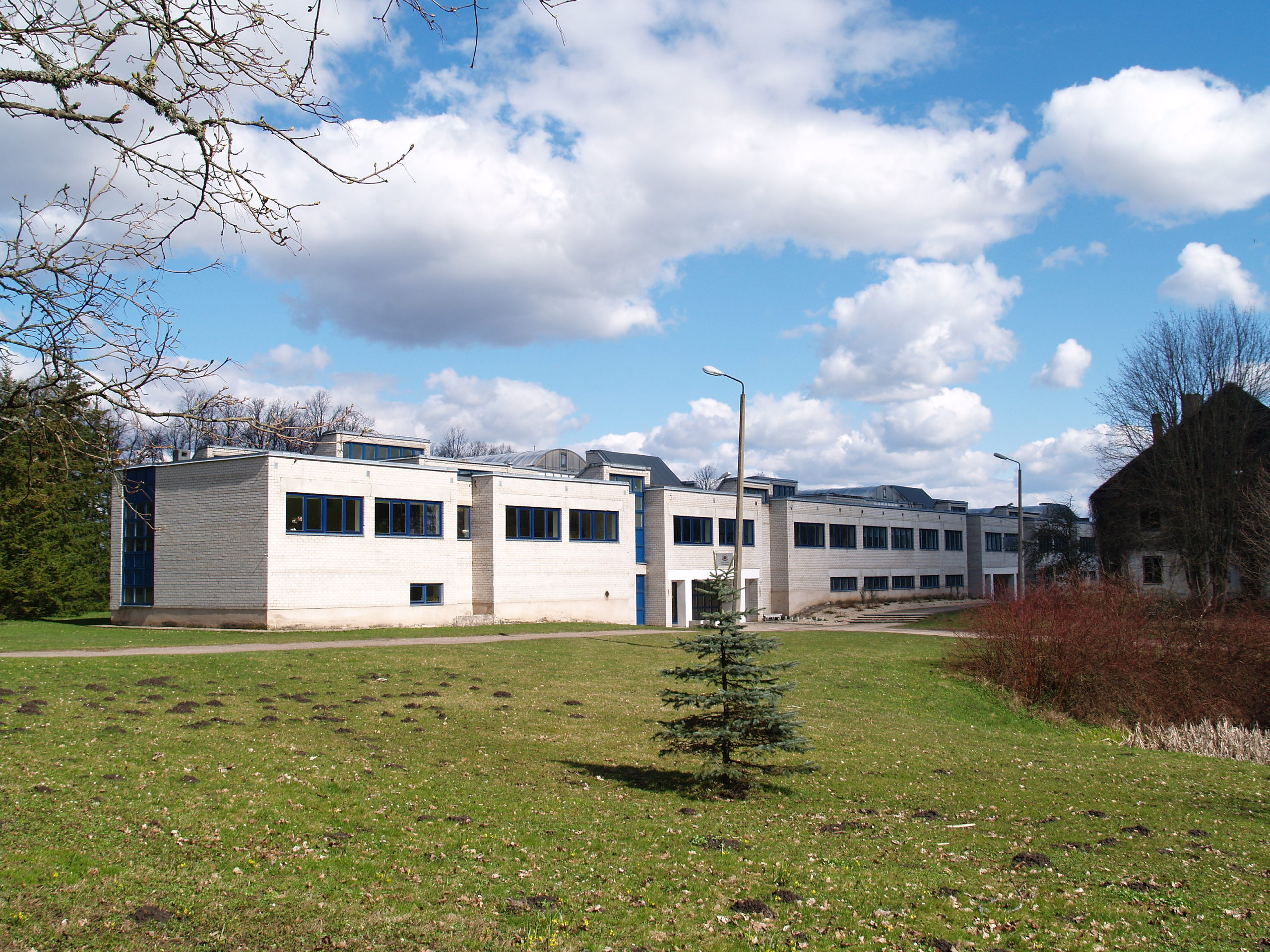
Olustvere School of Service and Rural Economics, a vocational school

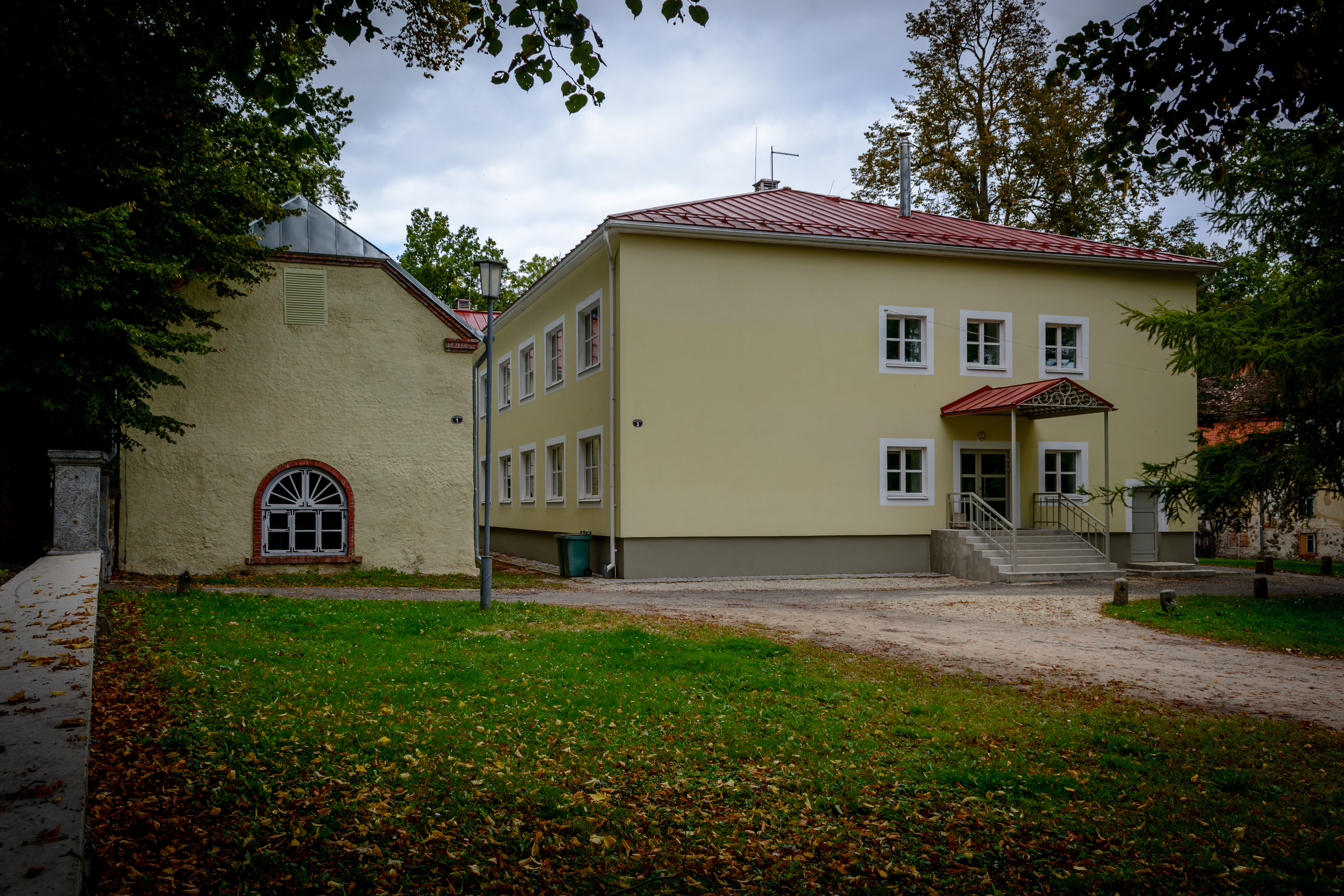
Manor's servant quarters

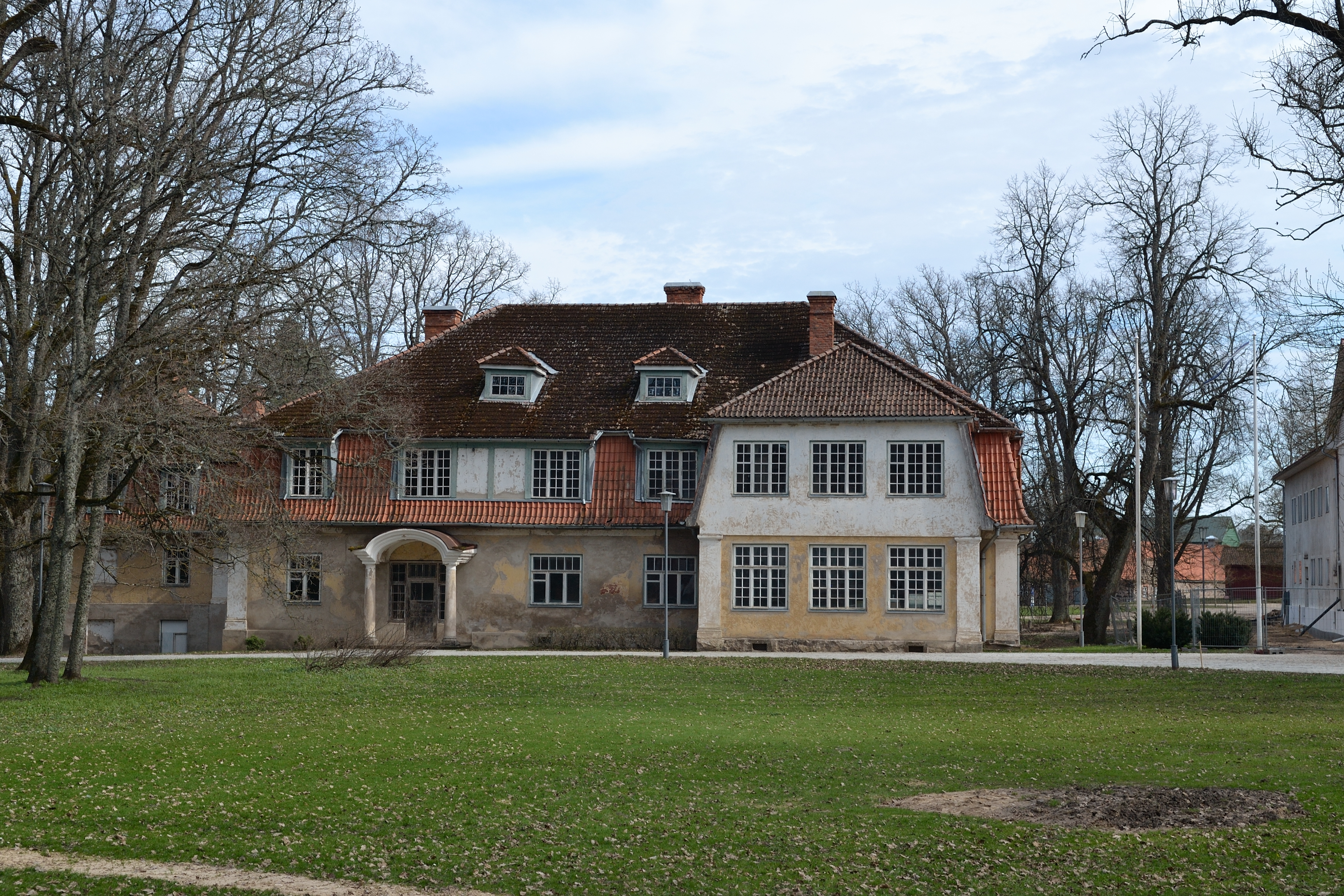
Manor's administor's house

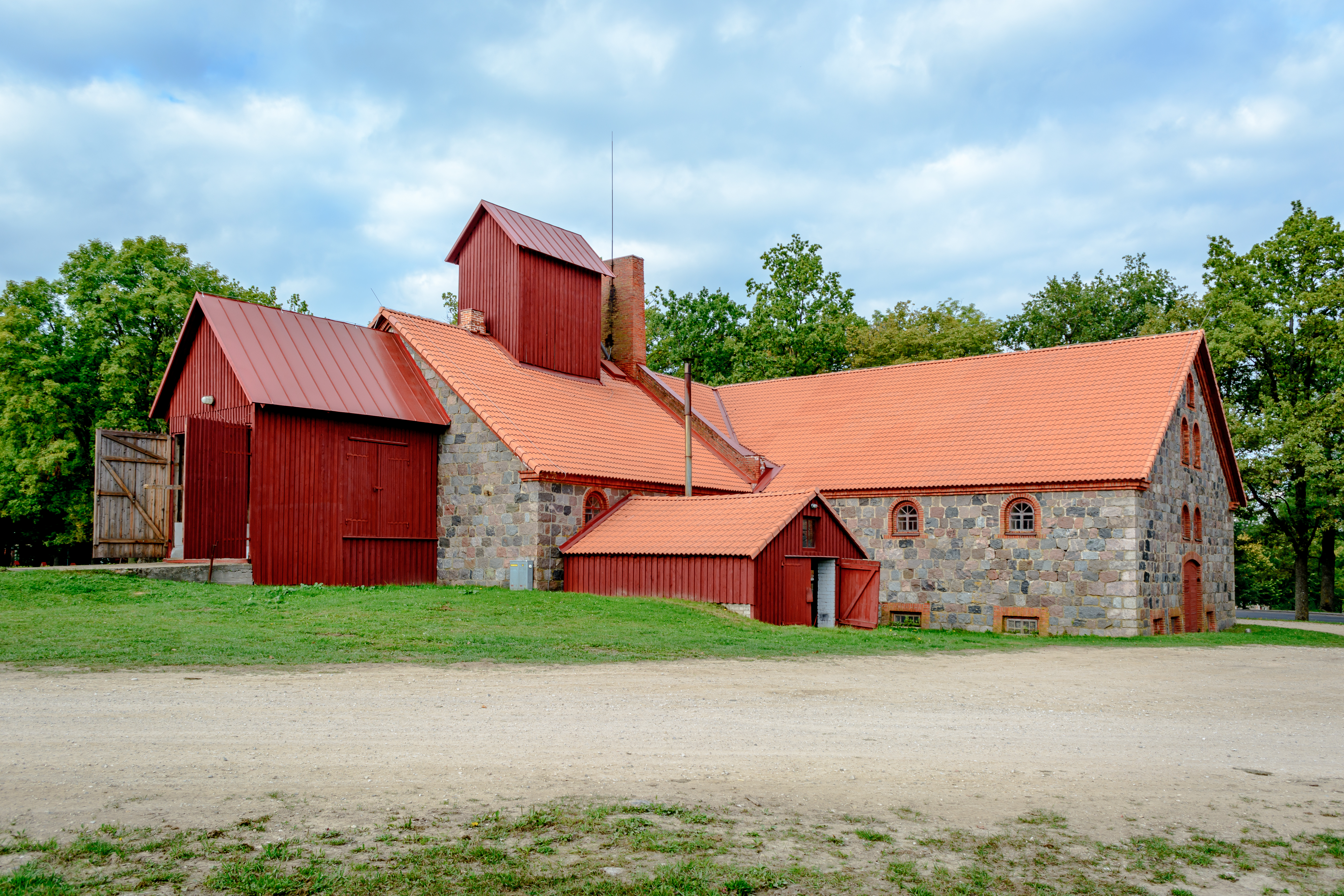
Drying barn

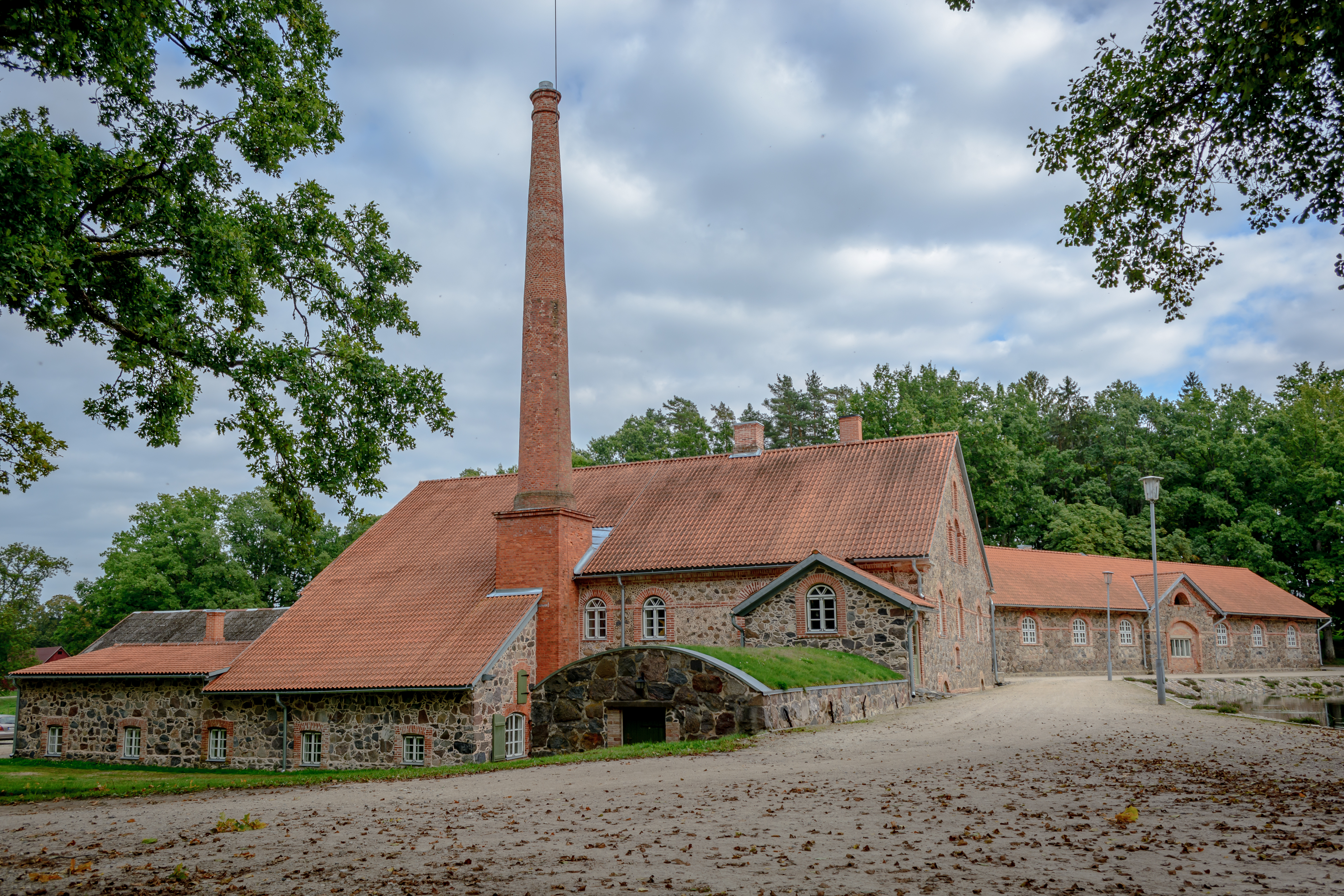
Distillery

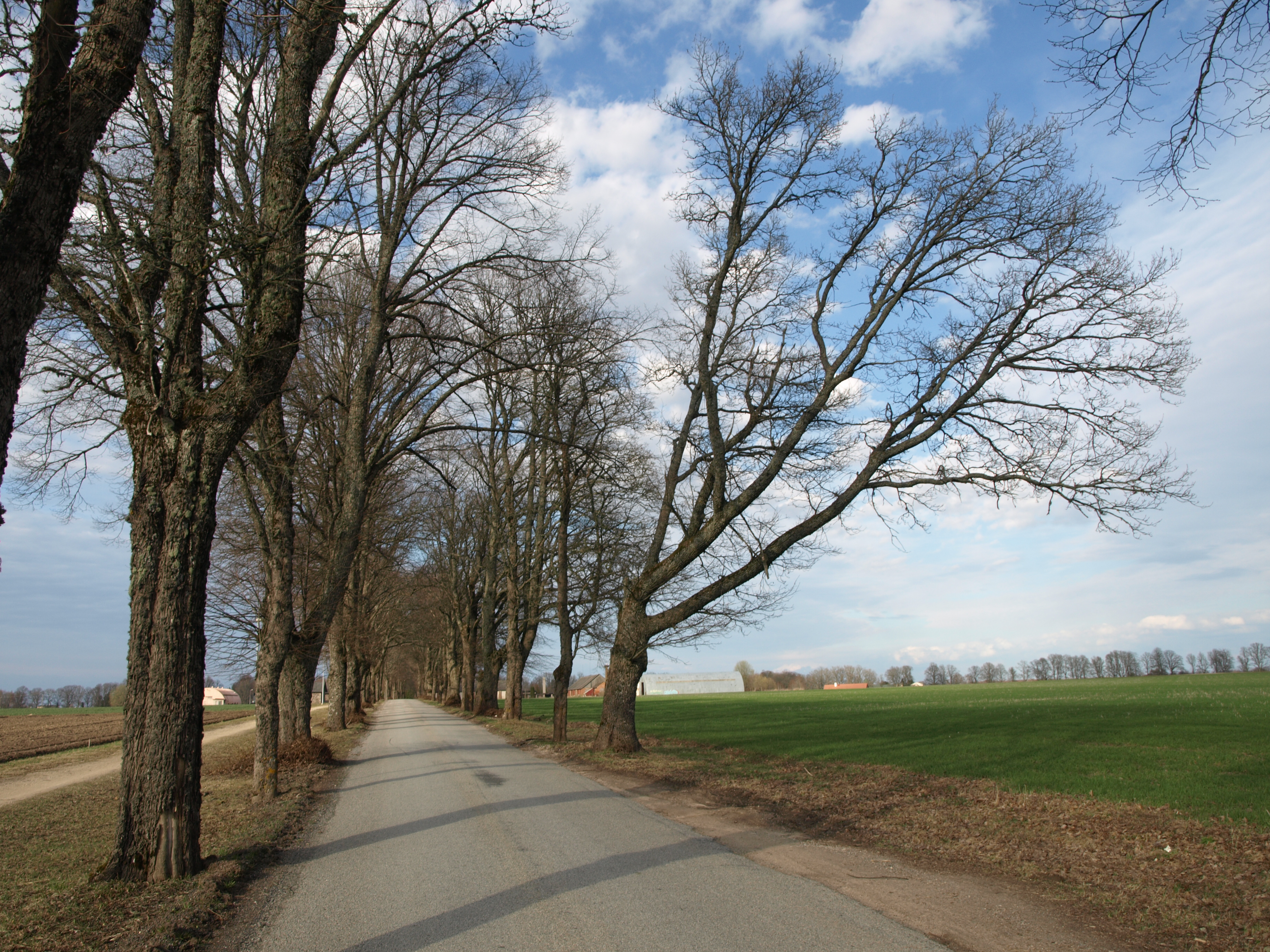
Manor road

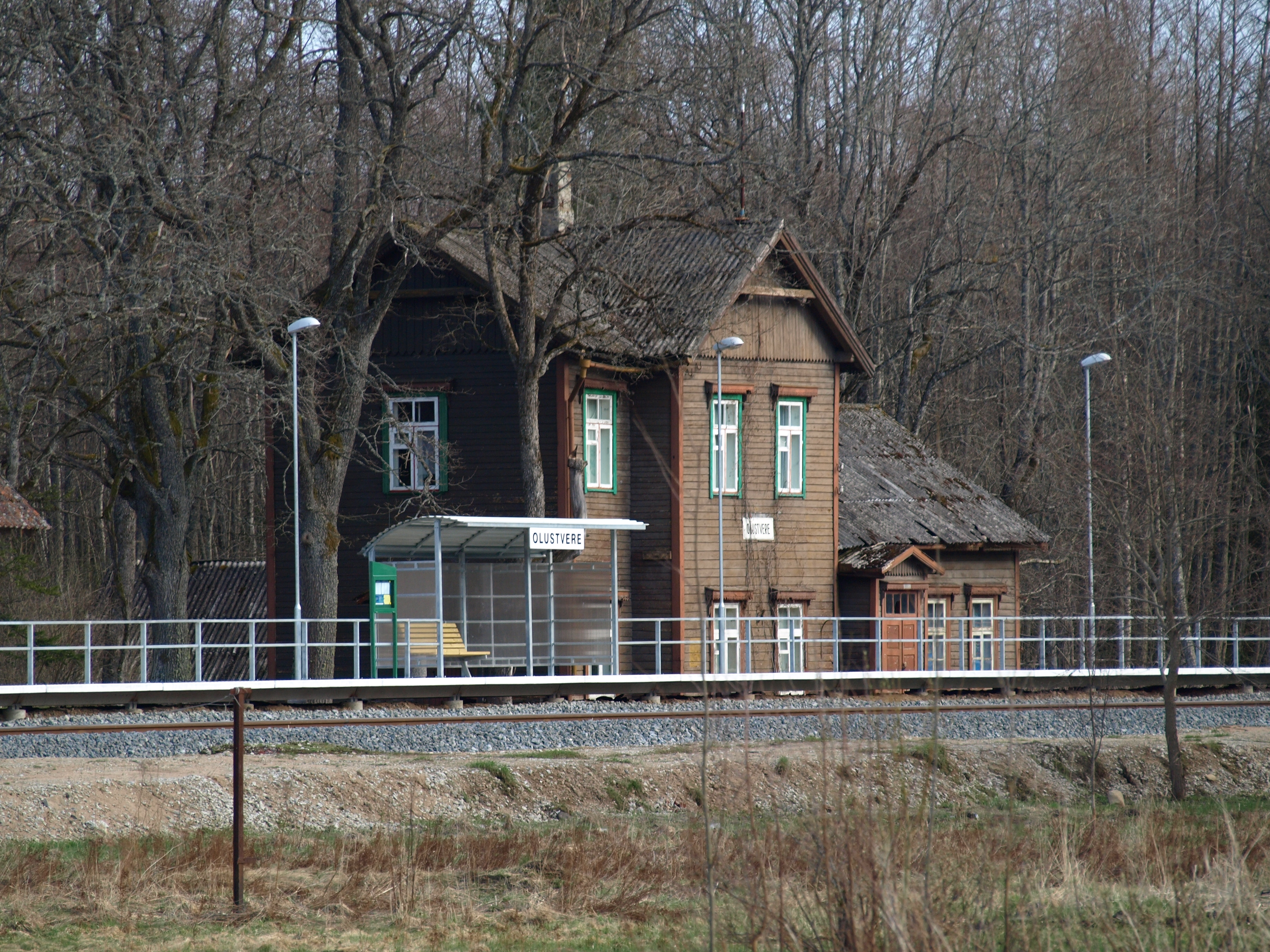
Olustvere station and railway stop
