= Mooste Parish =

Former municipality of Estonia

Coordinates: 58°9′37″N 27°11′28″E

Mooste Parish Mooste vald (in Estonian) Moostõ vald (in Võro)
- Former municipality of Estonia
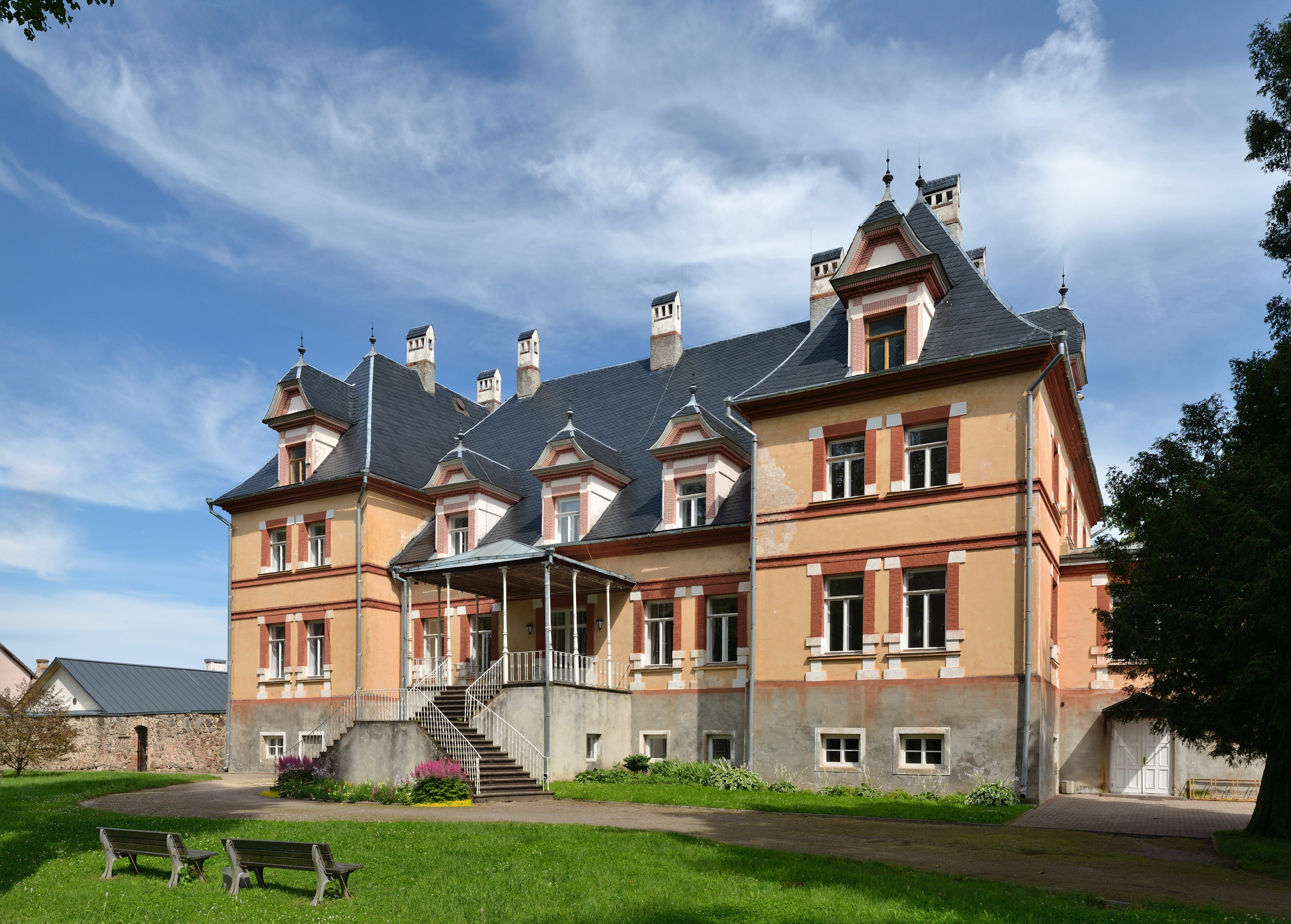
- Mooste manor

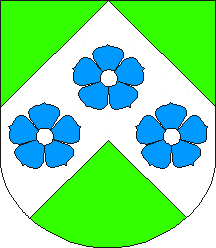
- Flag Coat of arms

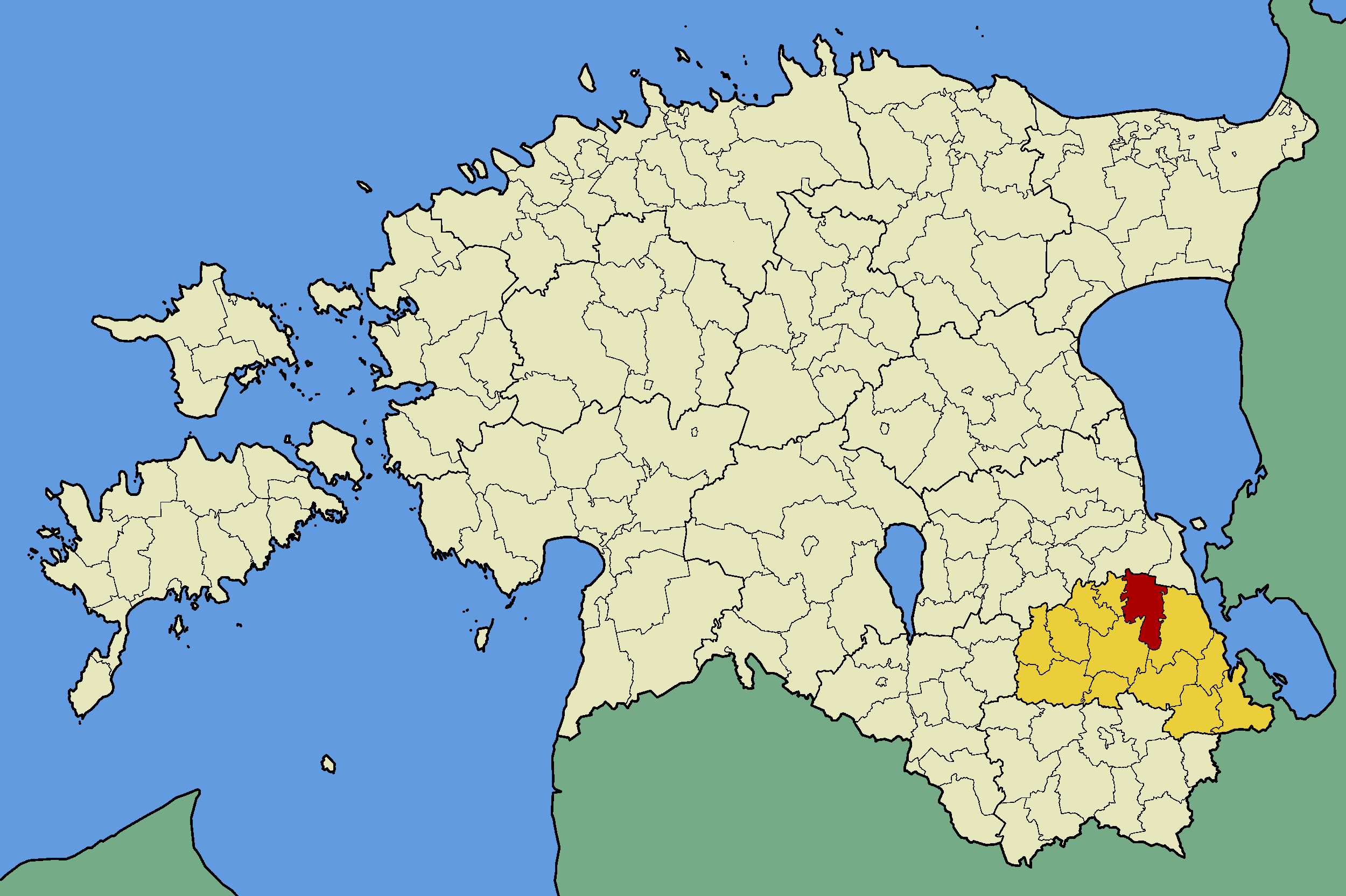
- Mooste Parish within Põlva County.
- Country: Estonia
- County: Põlva County
- Administrative centre: Mooste

Area
  - Total: 185.12 km^{2} (71.48 sq mi)

Population (01.01.2009)
  - Total: 1,542
  - Density: 8.330/km^{2} (21.57/sq mi)
- Website: www.mooste.ee

Mooste Parish (Estonian: Mooste vald; Võro: Moostõ vald) was a rural municipality of Estonia, in Põlva County. It had a population of 1542 (as of 1 January 2009) and an area of 185.12 km^{2}.

== Settlements ==
Small borough

Mooste

Villages

Jaanimõisa - Kaaru - Kadaja - Kanassaare - Kastmekoja - Kauksi - Laho - Rasina - Säässaare - Säkna - Savimäe - Suurmetsa - Terepi - Viisli
