= Pajusi Parish =

Former municipality of Estonia

Coordinates: 58.702°N 25.943°E

Pajusi Parish Pajusi vald
- Former municipality of Estonia
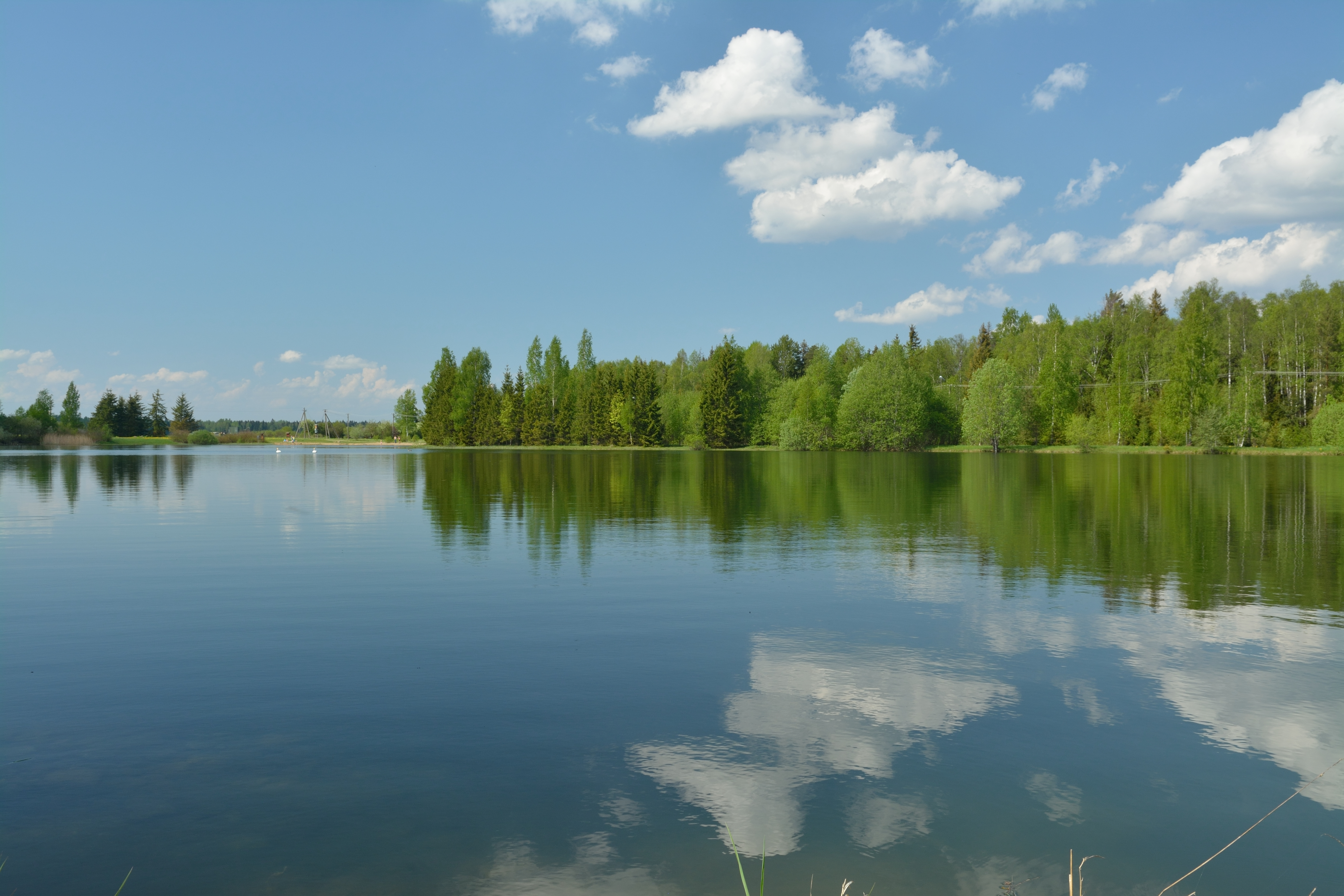
- Kõpu reservoir

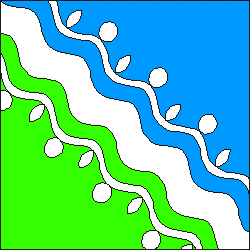
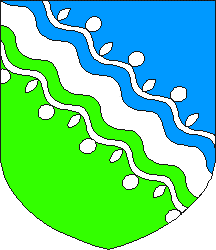
- Flag Coat of arms

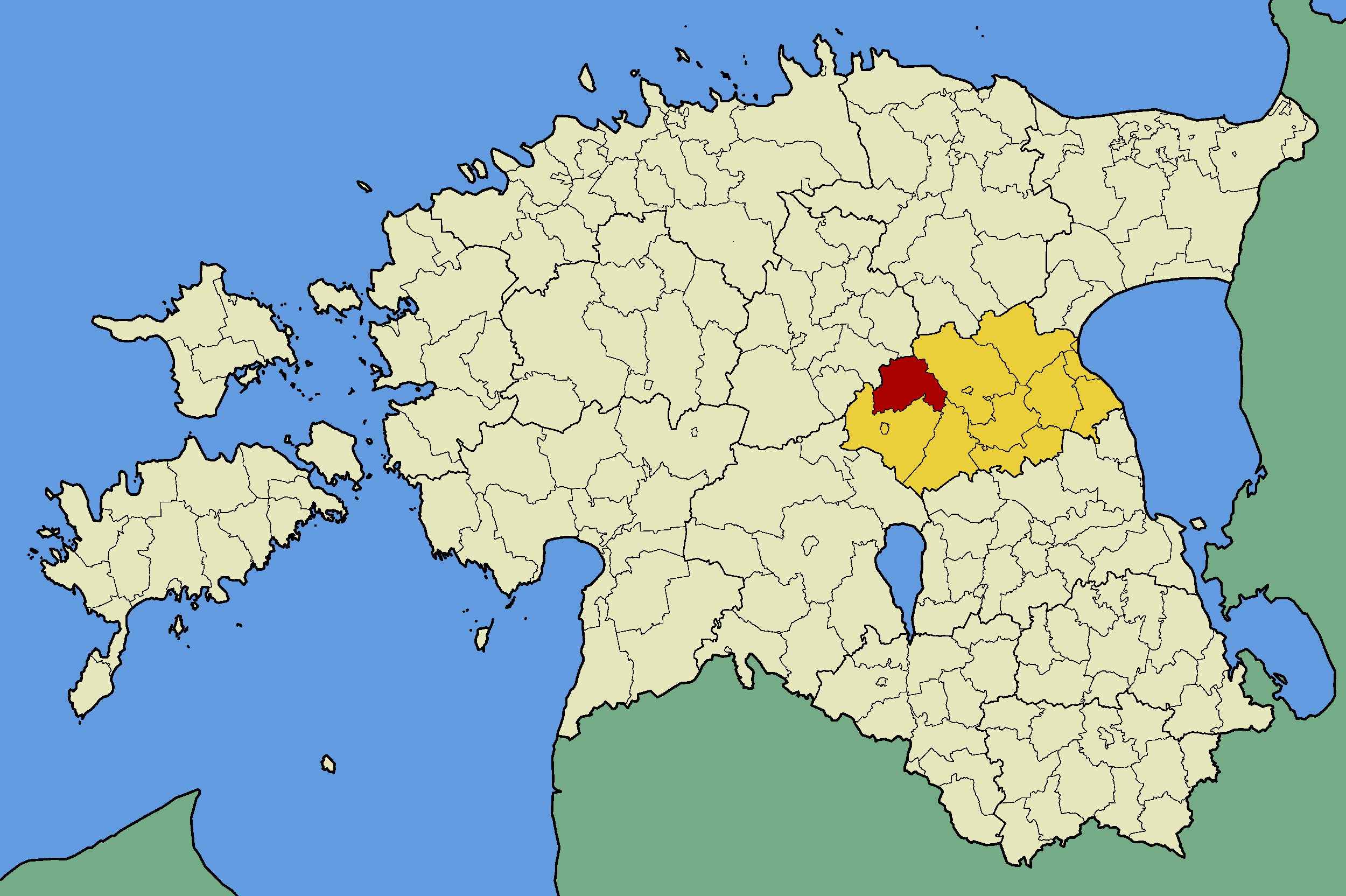
- Pajusi Parish within Jõgeva County.
- Country: Estonia
- County: Jõgeva County
- Administrative centre: Kalana

Government
  - Parish Elder: Reet Alev (People's Union)

Area
  - Total: 232.4 km^{2} (89.7 sq mi)

Population (2003)
  - Total: 1,623
  - Density: 6.984/km^{2} (18.09/sq mi)
- Website: www.pajusi.ee

Pajusi (Estonian: Pajusi vald) was a rural municipality of Estonia, in Jõgeva County. It had a population of 1,623 (2003) and an area of 232.4 km².

== Villages ==
Pajusi Parish had 23 villages: Aidu, Arisvere, Kaave, Kalana, Kauru, Kose, Kõpu, Kõrkküla, Lahavere, Loopre, Luige, Mõisaküla, Mõrtsi, Nurga, Pajusi, Pisisaare, Sopimetsa, Tapiku, Tõivere, Uuevälja, Vorsti, Vägari, Väljataguse.

== See also ==
- Endla Nature Reserve
