= Savimäe =

Savimäe may refer to several places in Estonia:

- Savimäe, Põlva County, village in Põlva Parish, Põlva County
- Savimäe, Võru County, village in Rõuge Parish, Võru County
