= Mart Saar =

Estonian composer (1882–1963)

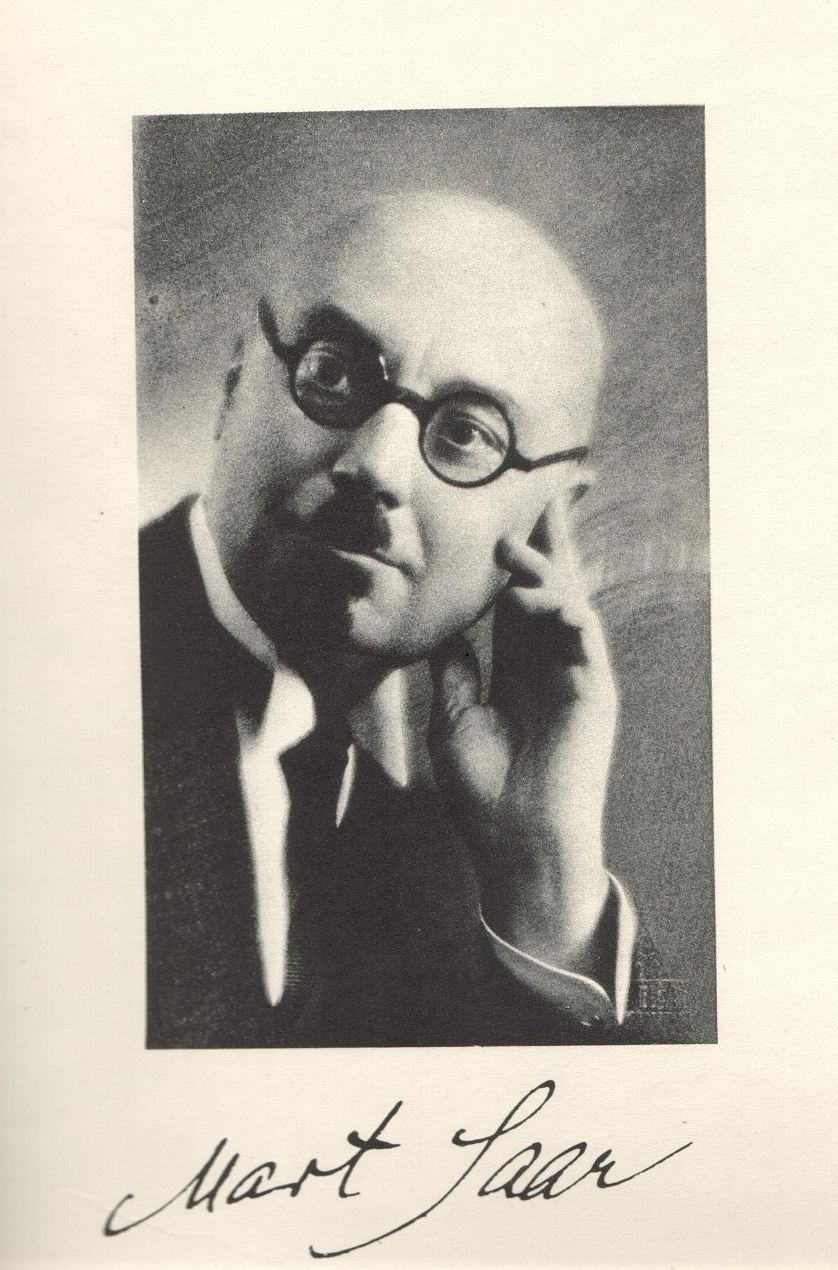
- Saar in 1932
- Born: 28 September 1882; Hüpassaare, Kreis Fellin, Livonian Governorate, Russian Empire
- Died: 28 October 1963 (aged 81); Tallinn, then part of Estonian SSR, Soviet Union
- Occupations: Composer; organist; collector of folk songs
- Years active: 1911–1963
- Spouse(s): Elise Saar (née Paalmann); Magda Elisabeth Saar (née Takk)

Mart Saar (28 September [O.S. 15 September] 1882 – 28 October 1963) was an Estonian composer, organist and collector of folk songs.

== Childhood ==
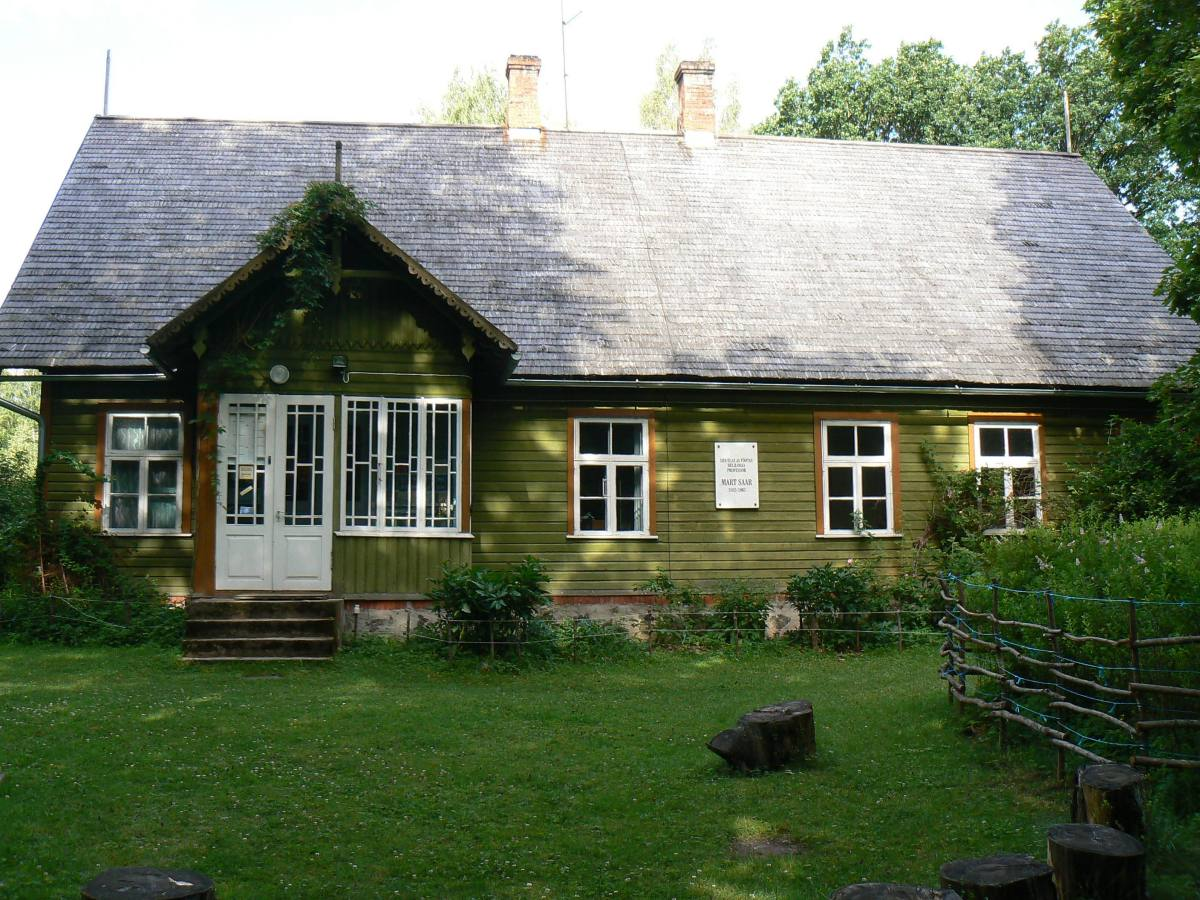
Birthplace of Mart Saar.

Saar was born in the small borough of Hüpassaare (now in Karjasoo, Suure-Jaani Parish), Kreis Fellin in the Livonian Governorate of the Russian Empire (now Estonia), to Mihkel and Ann Saar (née Kimmel). His father was employed in the forestry business. He was the eldest of fours siblings; Anna (1885–1968), Hans (1895–1979) and Jaan (1897–1898). He received his education in the village school at Kaansoo and the Suure-Jaani Parish school. His music teacher in the Suure-Jaani parish school was Joosep Kapp, the father of Artur Kapp, another famous Estonian composer. In addition, Saar's father was a talented organist, who gave him lessons at home.

== Adult life ==
In 1901, Saar left home to study music at the Saint Petersburg Conservatory. He graduated in 1908 but chose to continue his studies. After graduation in 1911, he became a music teacher in Tartu. Ten years later, in 1921, he moved to Tallinn, Estonia as a freelance composer and organist. He spent his summers in his native borough Hüpassaare.

In August 1915, he married Elise Paalmann. The couple had two children; a daughter Heli (1917–1975) and a son, Ülo (1927–1945). The marriage ended in divorce when Elise moved to the United States in 1937, initially expecting Saar to join her. However, Saar decided that he did not wish to leave Estonia. Saar later married Magda Elisabeth Takk and had a daughter named Tuuli.

== Career ==
Early in his career, Saar was influenced by the European music of the early 19th century.

Later in his life, Saar combined Estonian folk music with more contemporary sounds. In addition to composing, Saar also wrote lyrics to some of his songs. Usually, these lyrics express a love for Estonia and nature. They also address the brevity of life. Saar's lyrics have been compared to the poetry of Anna Haava and Juhan Liiv.

== Selected works ==
Works for mixed chorus include:

- Põhjavaim (Northern Spirit)
- Seitse Sammeldunud Sängi (Seven Moss-Clad Tombs)
- Oh Kodumaa (Oh, My Homeland)
- Mis Sa Nutad, tammekene? (Why Are You Weeping, Oak Tree?)
- Kõver Kuuseke (Crooked Fir)
- Mälestus (A Memory)
- Allik (Wellspring)

Works for male choir include:

- Küll ma Laulaks (I Would Sing)

Works for female choir include:

- Päikesele (To The Sun)

Solo songs include:

- Must Lind (Black Bird)
- Lauliku Talveüksindus (Singer's Winter Loneliness)

Piano music includes:

- 20 Rahvaviisi (20 Folk Songs)
- Eesti Süidid (Estonian Suites)
- Prelüüd ja Fuuga G-duur (Prelude and Fugue in G)
- Humoresk (Humoresque)
- Skizze (Preludes)
