= Vastemõisa =

Village in Estonia

- Village
- Location in Estonia
- Coordinates: 58°26′31″N 25°26′44″E
- Country: Estonia
- County: Viljandi County
- Municipality: Põhja-Sakala Parish

Population (2009)
  - Total: 435

Vastemõisa (German: Wastemois) is a village in Põhja-Sakala Parish, Viljandi County in central Estonia. It has a population of 435 (as of 2009). Until 2005 when Vastemõisa Parish was merged to Suure-Jaani Parish, Vastemõisa was the administrative centre of Vastemõisa Parish. In 2017, Suure-Jaani Parish was merged to Põhja-Sakala Parish.
