= Vastemõisa Parish =

Former municipality of Estonia

Vastemõisa Parish Vastemõisa vald
- Former municipality of Estonia
- Interactive map of Vastemõisa Parish
- Coordinates: 58.45°N 25.45°E
- Country: Estonia
- Administrative centre: Vastemõisa

Vastemõisa Parish (Estonian: Vastemõisa vald) was a rural municipality of Estonia, in Viljandi County.

== Overview ==
The parish existed until 1950. On 19 December 1991 the parish was re-established. On 16 June 2005 the parish was merged with Suure-Jaani Parish.
