= Arojärv =

Lake in Estonia

- Location within Estonia
- Location: Põlva Parish, Põlva County, Estonia
- Coordinates: 58°12′40″N 27°17′0″E
- Basin countries: Estonia
- Max. length: 880 meters (2,890 ft)
- Surface area: 28.7 hectares (71 acres)
- Average depth: 1.6 meters (5 ft 3 in)
- Max. depth: 3.0 meters (9.8 ft)
- Shore length^{1}: 2,420 meters (7,940 ft)
- Surface elevation: 36.4 m (119 ft)
- ^{1} Shore length is not a well-defined measure.

Arojärv (also Rasina Arojärv or Arujärv) is a lake in Estonia. It is located in the village of Savimäe in Põlva Parish, Põlva County.

== Physical description ==
The lake has an area of 28.7 hectares (71 acres). The lake has an average depth of 1.6 meters (5 ft 3 in) and a maximum depth of 3.0 meters (9.8 ft). It is 880 meters (2,890 ft) long, and its shoreline measures 2,420 meters (7,940 ft).

== See also ==
- List of lakes of Estonia
