= Kalana =

Kalana may refer to:

- Kalana, Mali, town in Gouandiaka Commune, Yanfolila Cercle, Sikasso Region, Mali
- Kalana, Hiiu County, village in Hiiu Parish, Hiiu County, Estonia
- Kalana, Jõgeva County, village in Pajusi Parish, Jõgeva County, Estonia
- Kalana Greene (born 1987), American basketball player
