= Maalasti Nature Reserve =

Protected area in Estonia

- Location within Estonia
- Location: Estonia
- Coordinates: 58°35′N 25°41′E
- Area: 530 ha (1,300 acres)
- Established: 2006 (2014)

Maalasti Nature Reserve is a nature reserve which is located in Viljandi County, Estonia.

The area of the nature reserve is 530 ha.

The protected area was founded in 2006 to protect threatened species (greater spotted eagle and black stork) in villages of former Kõo Parish and Suure-Jaani Parish. In 2013 the protected area was designated to the nature reserve.
