= Aidu, Jõgeva County =

Village in Estonia

Aidu
- Village
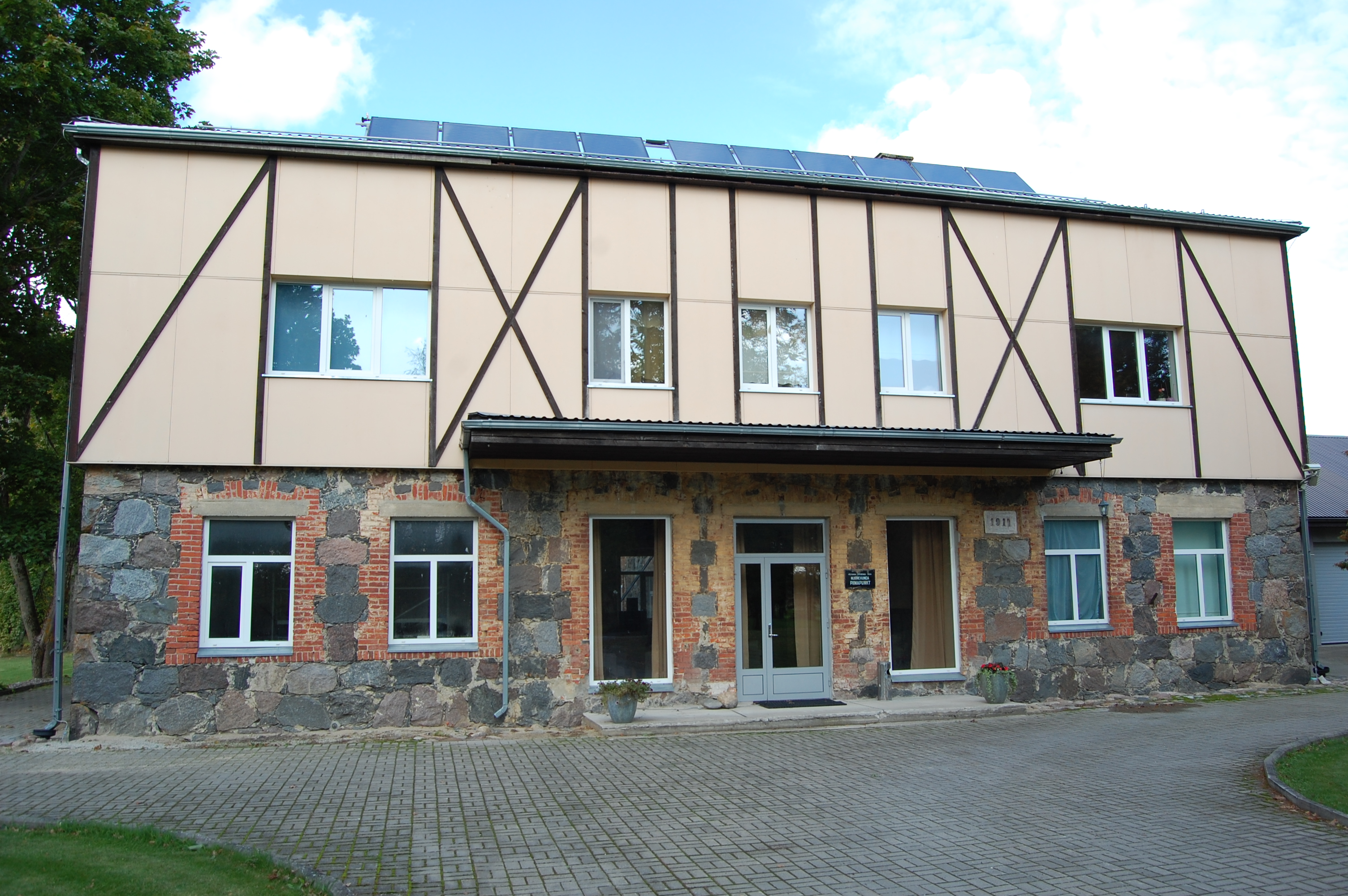
- Aidu village guesthouse

- Location within Estonia
- Coordinates: 58°43′56″N 26°11′55″E
- Country: Estonia
- County: Jõgeva County
- Parish: Põltsamaa Parish
- Time zone: UTC+2 (EET)
  - Summer (DST): UTC+3 (EEST)

Aidu is a small village in Põltsamaa Parish, Jõgeva County in eastern Estonia with an area of 0.286 square kilometres (0.110 sq mi), and population of 33.

== See also ==
- Aidu Nature Reserve
