= Kuressaare Parish =

Former municipality of Estonia

Kuressaare Parish Kuressaare vald
- Former municipality of Estonia
- Country: Estonia
- Administrative centre: Kuressaare

Kuressaare Parish (Estonian: Kuressaare vald) was a rural municipality of Estonia, in Saare County. The parish was formed in 1938. It existed until 1950. The parish was re-established in 1992. In 1999 the parish was merged with Kaarma Parish.
