= Karjasoo =

Village in Estonia

- Village
- Location in Estonia
- Coordinates: 58°33′10″N 25°17′41″E
- Country: Estonia
- County: Viljandi County
- Municipality: Põhja-Sakala Parish

Population (2009)
  - Total: 7

Karjasoo is a village in Põhja-Sakala Parish, Viljandi County in central Estonia, located about 10 km (6 mi) west of the town of Suure-Jaani, the administrative centre of the municipality. Most of the village's territory is covered by the northern part of Kuresoo Bog, which is part of Soomaa National Park. In 2009 Karjasoo had a population of 7.

The composer, organist, and folk song collector Mart Saar (1882–1963) was born in Hüpassaare, which is now part of the village of Karjasoo.

== Gallery ==
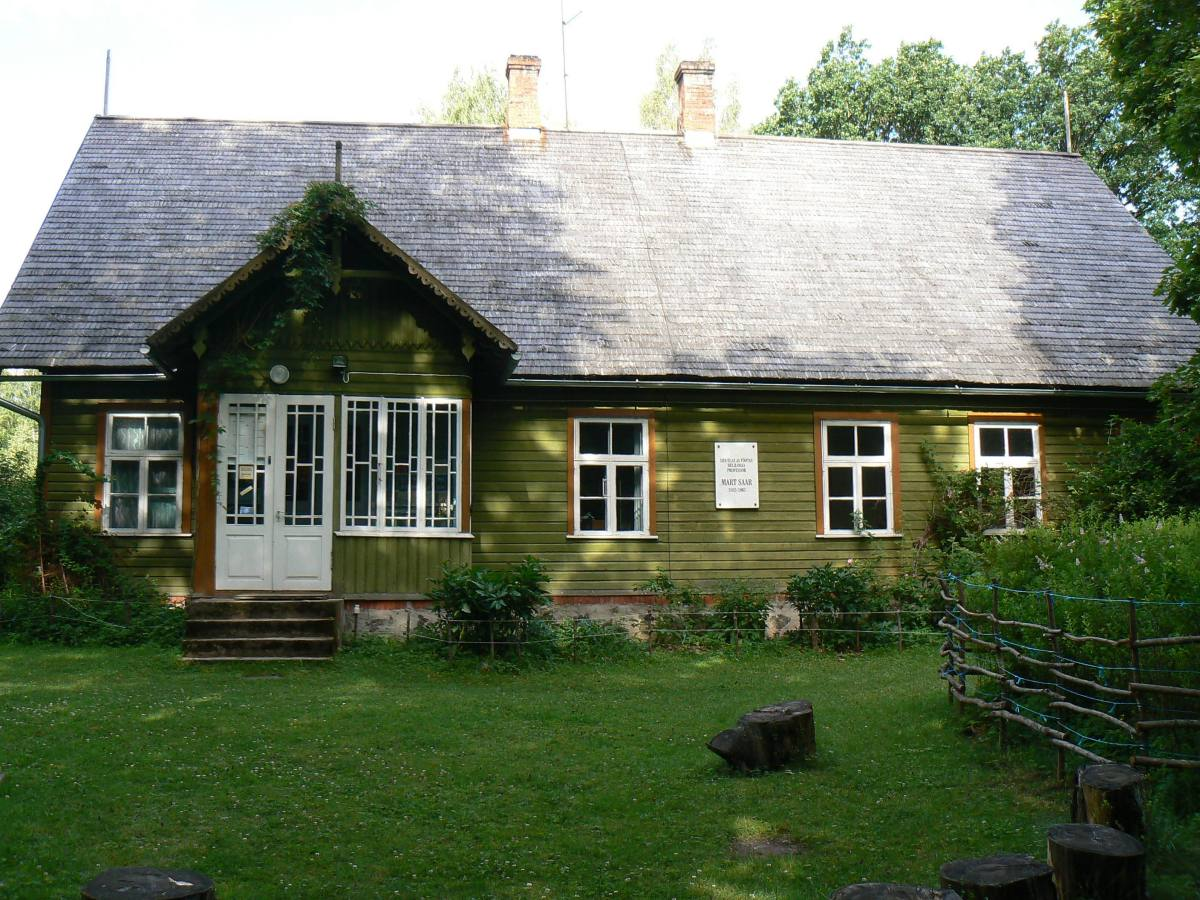
Birthplace of the composer Mart Saar in Hüpassaare

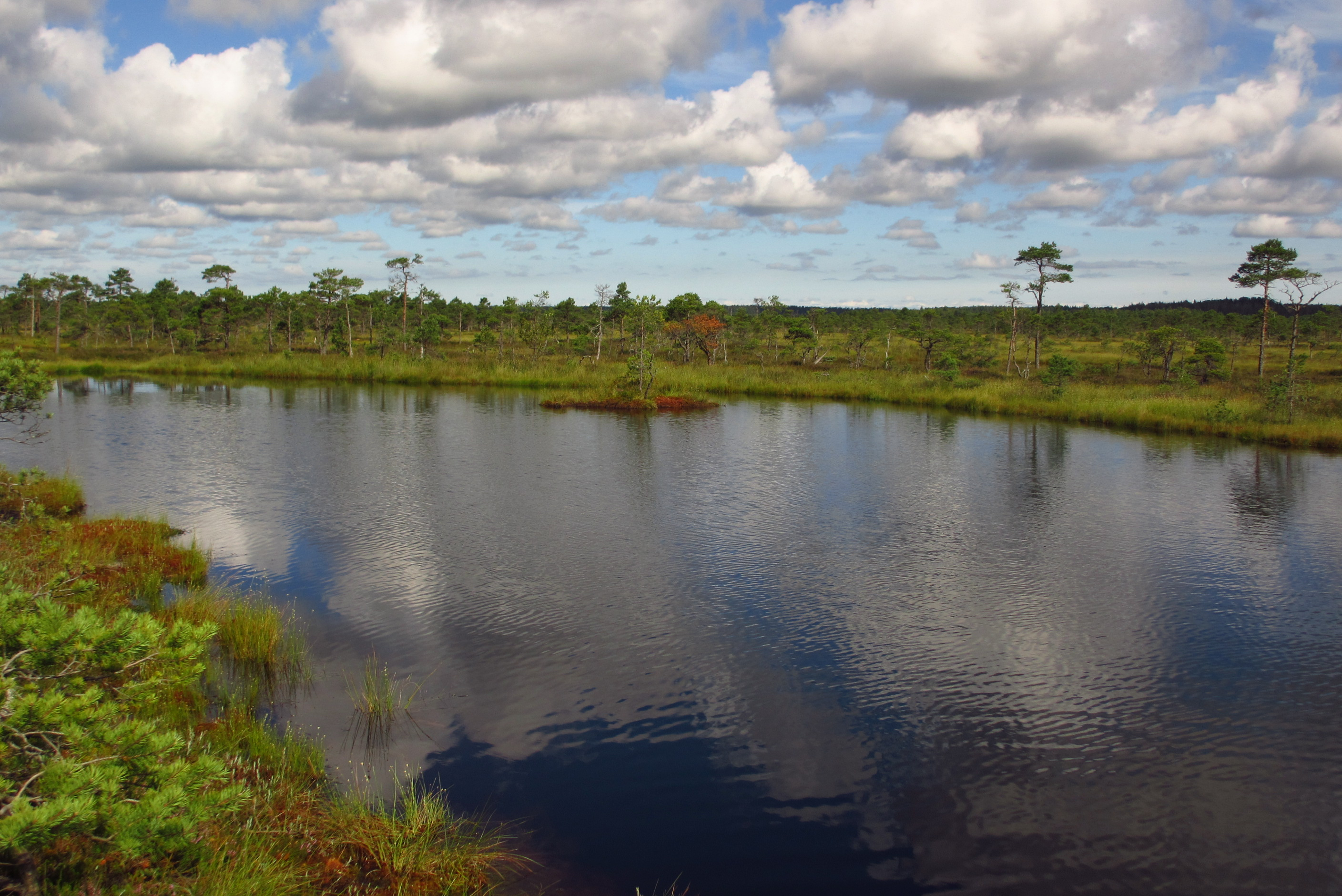
Bog in Hüpassaare
