= Mooste =

Borough in Estonia

- Small borough
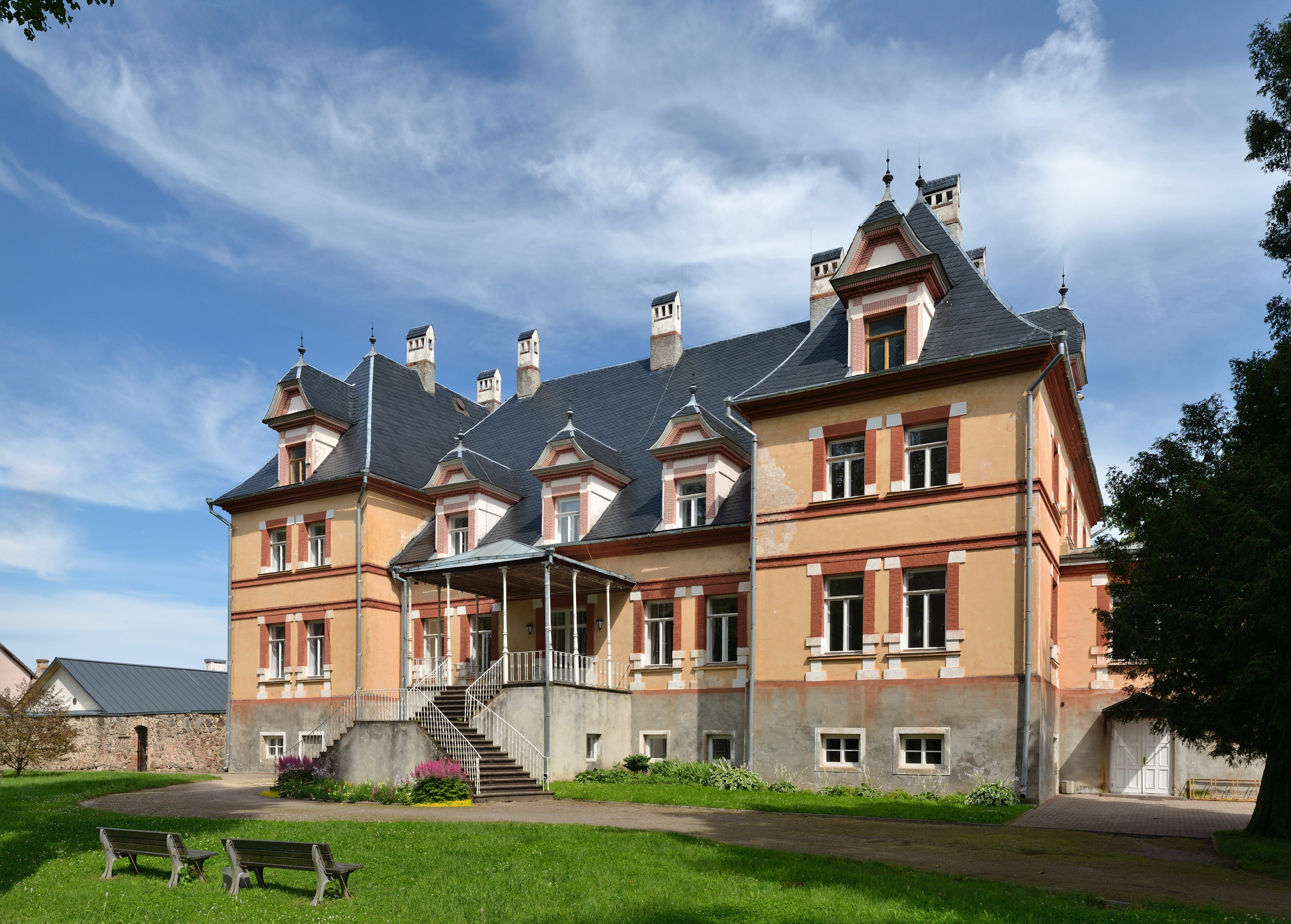
- Mooste manor

- Location in Estonia
- Coordinates: 58°09′43″N 27°11′45″E
- Country: Estonia
- County: Põlva County
- Municipality: Põlva Parish

Mooste is a small borough in Põlva Parish, Põlva County, Estonia.

== Mooste manor ==
Mooste (German: Moisekatz) estate has a very long history, the first written records date from 1561. During that time, it belonged to a local member of the Baltic nobility, and stayed in the hands of various noble families for the next 121 years. In 1682, during the time of Swedish rule in Estonia, the estate was, however, expropriated during one of the so-called reductions and became state property. Following the Great Northern War, it thus befell the new, Russian government, and was given by Peter the Great to Count Pavel Yaguzhinsky. Later, however, it appears once more as the property of various Baltic German families. Following the Estonian Declaration of Independence in 1919 and the ensuing far-reaching land reform, the manor became state property. Today it houses a school.

Although the estate dates from the 16th century, the current main building is considerably later, dating from sometime between 1900 and 1910 and designed by Riga-based architect August Reinberg in so-called Heimat-style. The interior still boasts typical details such as decorated cocklestoves, wainscoting and coffered ceilings. In addition to the main building, several well-preserved and large outbuildings make up an unusually grand manor house ensemble.

== Notable people ==
Geochemist, paleogeographer and ecologist Jaan-Mati Punning (1940–2009) was born in Mooste.

== See also ==
- List of palaces and manor houses in Estonia
