= Lahojärv =

Lake in Estonia

- Location within Estonia
- Location: Põlva Parish, Põlva County, Estonia
- Coordinates: 58°8′58.14″N 27°8′22.94″E
- Basin countries: Estonia
- Max. length: 380 meters (1,250 ft)
- Surface area: 2.7 hectares (6.7 acres)
- Max. depth: 6.0 meters (19.7 ft)
- Shore length^{1}: 930 meters (3,050 ft)
- Surface elevation: 49.9 meters (164 ft)
- ^{1} Shore length is not a well-defined measure.

Lahojärv (also Lohujärv or Lahujärv) is a lake in southern Estonia. It is located in the village of Säässaare in Põlva Parish, Põlva County,

== Physical description ==
The lake has an area of 2.7 hectares (6.7 acres). The lake has a maximum depth of 6.0 meters (19.7 ft). It is 380 meters (1,250 ft) long, and its shoreline measures 930 meters (3,050 ft).

== See also ==
- List of lakes of Estonia
