= Loodna Parish =

Former municipality of Estonia

Loodna Parish Loodna vald
- Former municipality of Estonia
- Interactive map of Loodna Parish
- Coordinates: 58.91°N 24.3°E
- Country: Estonia
- Administrative centre: Sipa

Loodna Parish (Estonian: Loodna vald) was a rural municipality of Estonia, in Rapla County. The parish existed until 1890. The parish was re-established in 1990. In 2002 the parish was liquidated.
