= Aidu Nature Reserve =

Protected area in Estonia

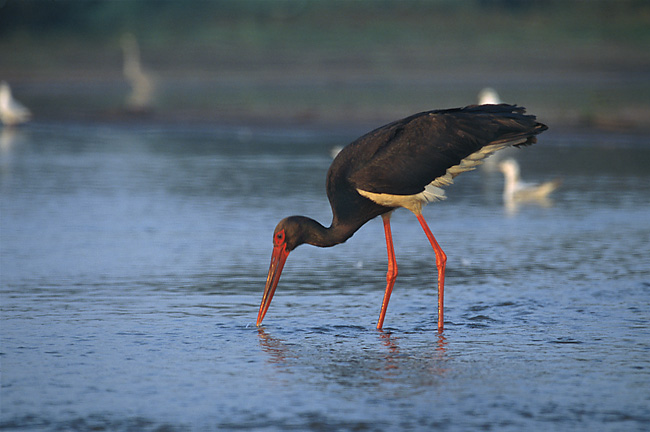
- Black stork in Aidu Nature Reserve

- Location within Estonia
- Location: Estonia
- Nearest city: Põltsamaa and Jõgeva
- Coordinates: 58°42′N 26°13′E
- Area: 611 ha (1,510 acres)
- Established: 2007

Aidu Nature Reserve (Estonian: Aidu looduskaitseala) is a nature reserve in Põltsamaa Parish, Jõgeva County, Estonia. The area is 3.16 km^{2}. It was established in October 2016.
