= Kalana, Jõgeva County =

Village in Estonia

Coordinates: 58°42′13″N 26°01′17″E

Kalana
- Village
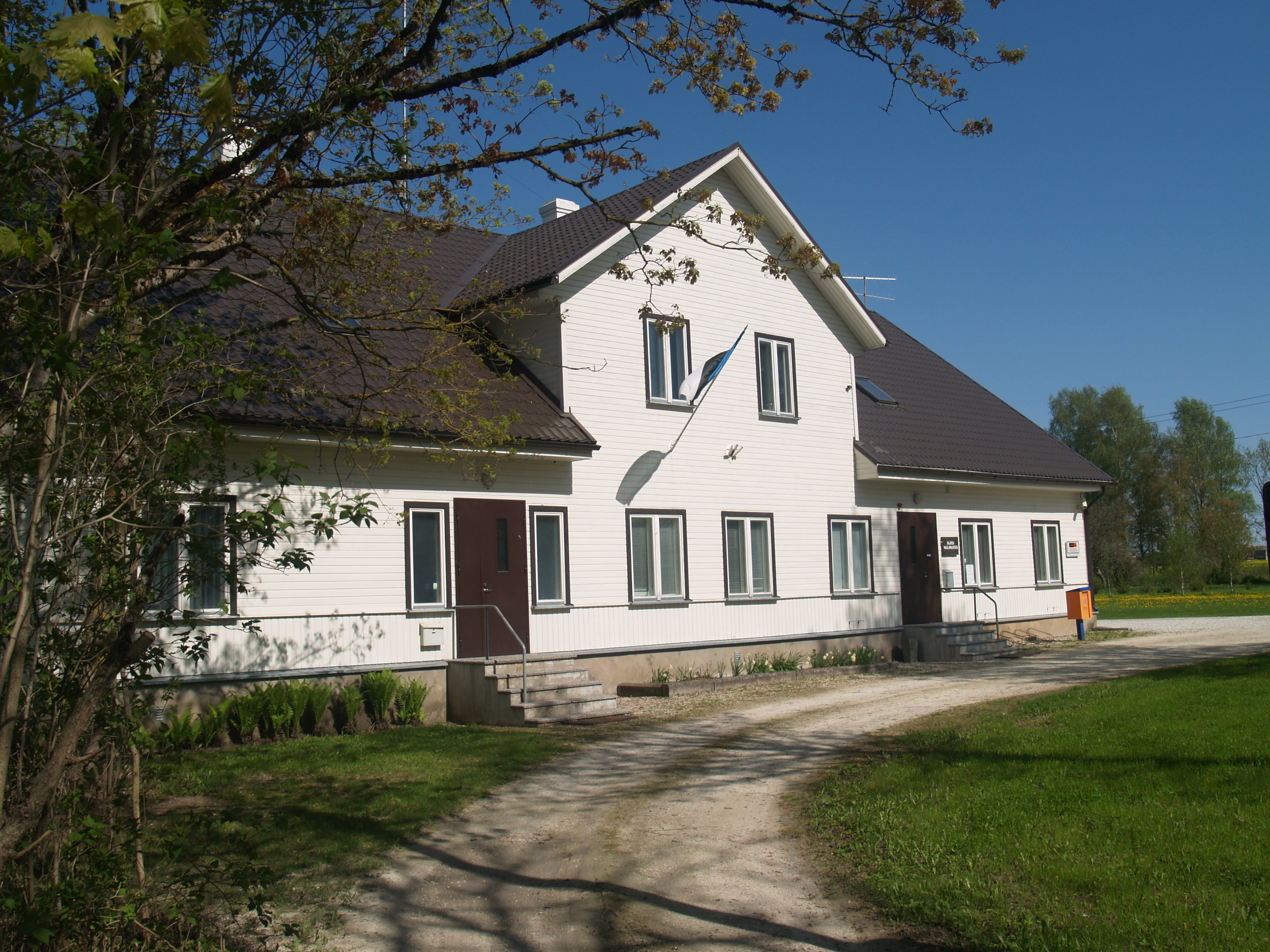
- Community center
- Interactive map of Kalana
- Country: Estonia
- County: Jõgeva County
- Parish: Põltsamaa Parish
- Time zone: UTC+2 (EET)
  - Summer (DST): UTC+3 (EEST)

Kalana is a village in Põltsamaa Parish, Jõgeva County in eastern Estonia. The village is recorded first from the year 1514 AD when it was known as Kallelinde. It was renamed Kalalina in 1583AD. Ancient finds, however, show settlement predated this time.

The village has limestone deposits which are quarried.
