= Suure-Jaani Parish =

Former municipality of Estonia

Coordinates: 58°32′7″N 25°27′58″E

Suure-Jaani Parish Suure-Jaani vald
- Former municipality of Estonia
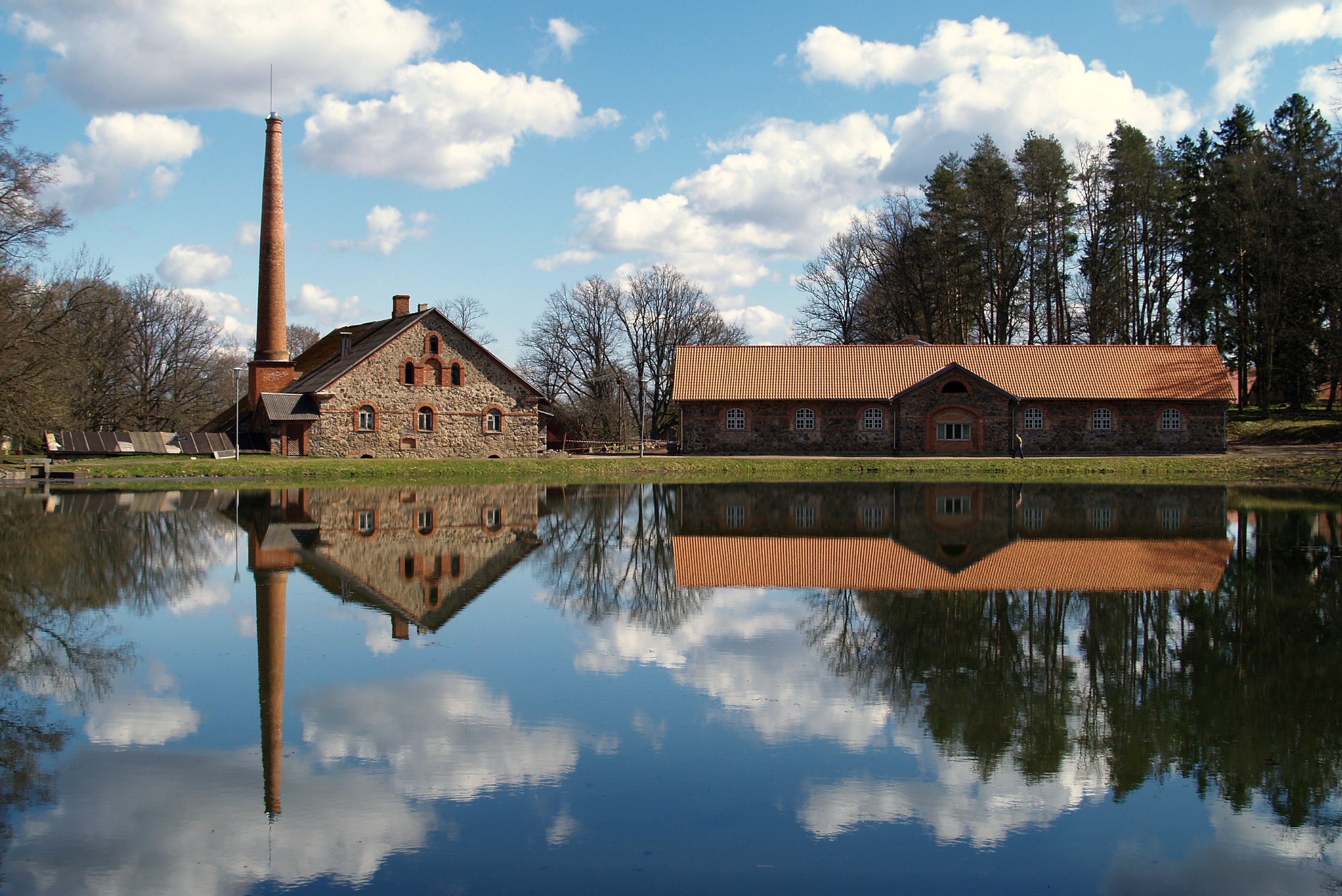
- Distillery and ox stable at Olustvere manor

- Flag Coat of arms

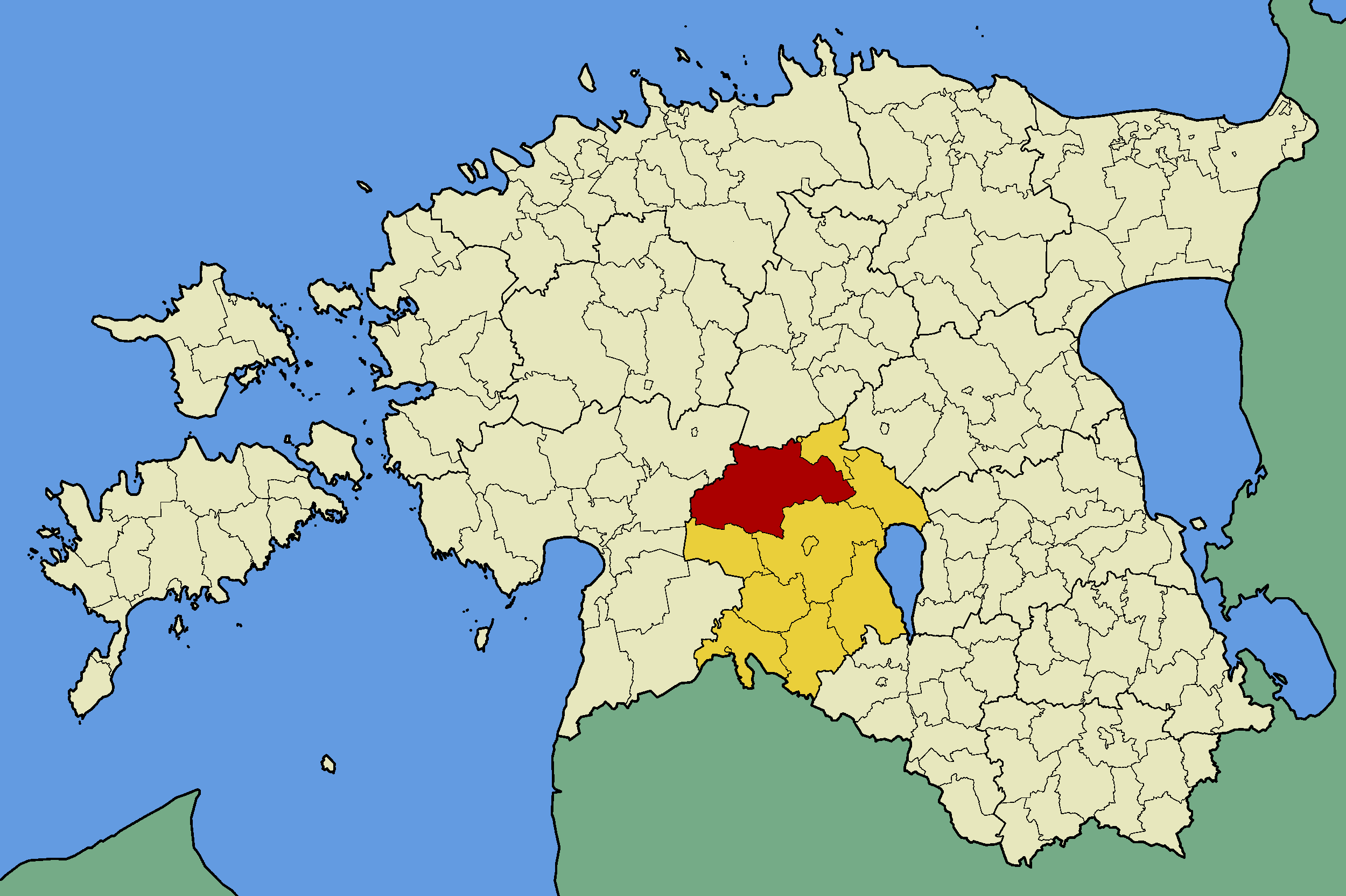
- Suure-Jaani Parish within Viljandi County.
- Country: Estonia
- County: Viljandi County
- Administrative centre: Suure-Jaani

Area
  - Total: 742.83 km^{2} (286.81 sq mi)

Population (01.01.2009)
  - Total: 6,178
  - Density: 8.317/km^{2} (21.54/sq mi)
- Website: www.suure-jaani.ee

Suure-Jaani Parish (Estonian: Suure-Jaani vald) was a rural municipality of Estonia, in Viljandi County. It had a population of 6,178 (as of 1 January 2009) and an area of 742.83 km^{2}.

== Settlements ==
Town

Suure-Jaani

Small borough

Olustvere

Villages

Aimla - Ängi - Arjadi - Epra - Ilbaku - Ivaski - Jälevere - Jaska - Kabila - Kärevere - Karjasoo - Kerita - Kibaru - Kildu - Kobruvere - Kõidama - Kootsi - Kuhjavere - Kuiavere - Kurnuvere - Lahmuse - Lemmakõnnu - Lõhavere - Mäeküla - Metsküla - Mudiste - Munsi - Navesti - Nuutre - Paelama - Päraküla - Põhjaka - Rääka - Reegoldi - Riiassaare - Sandra - Sürgavere - Tääksi - Taevere - Tällevere - Ülde - Vastemõisa - Vihi - Võhmassaare - Võivaku - Võlli

== People ==
Actress Raine Loo (1945–2020), was born in Taevere Parish, which is now part of Suure-Jaani Parish.

== Gallery ==
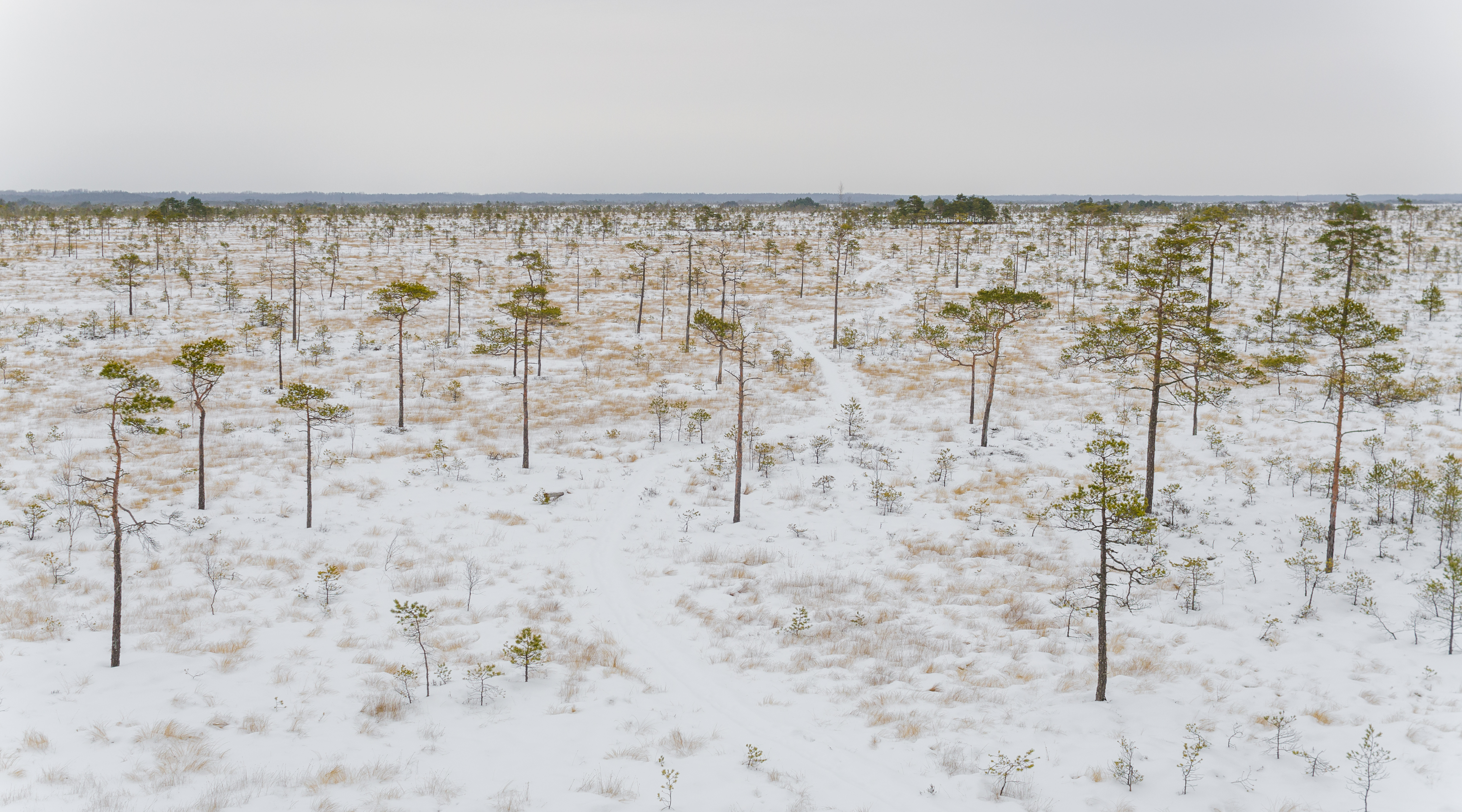
Kuresoo bog in winter

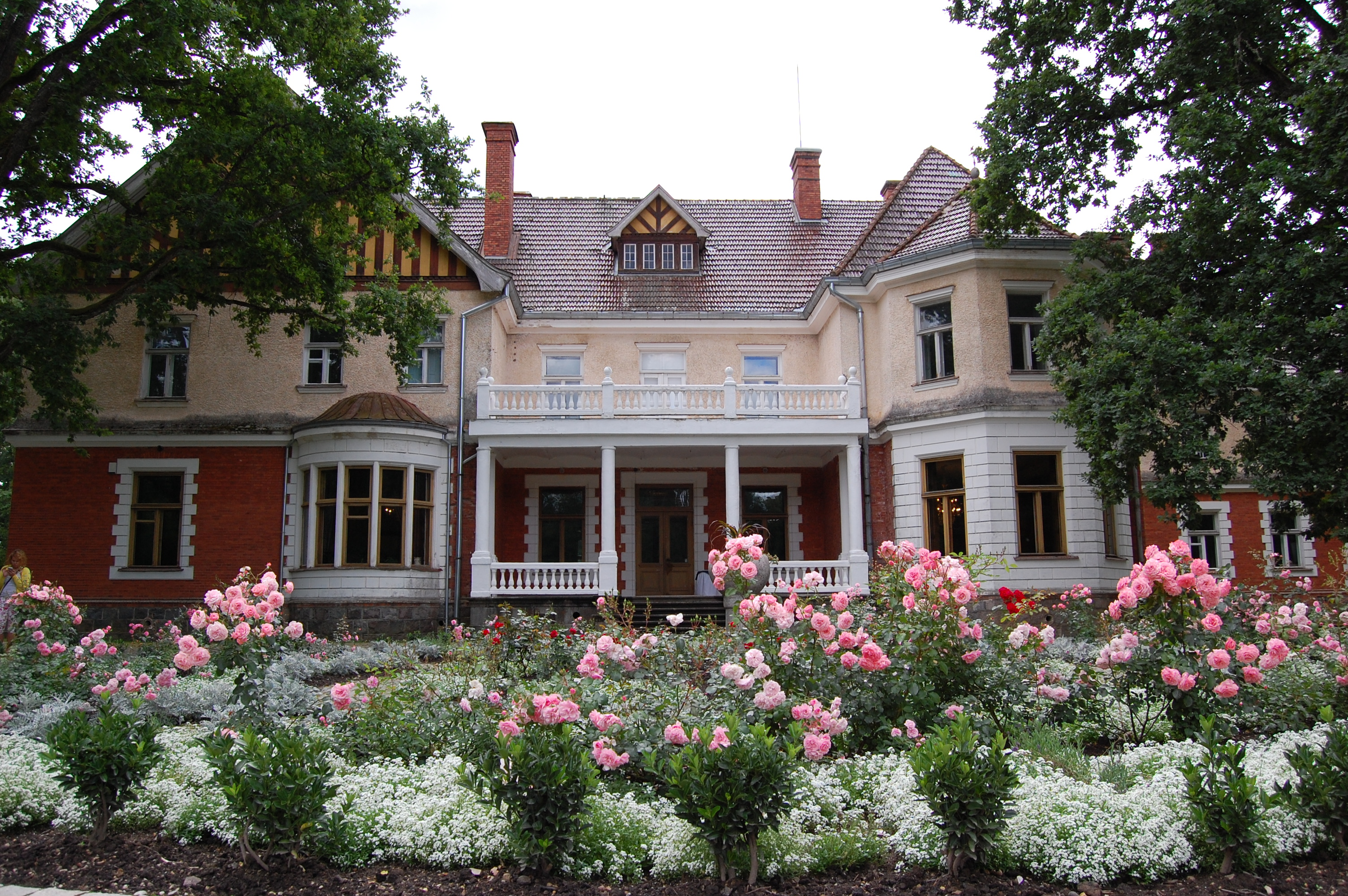
Olustvere manor

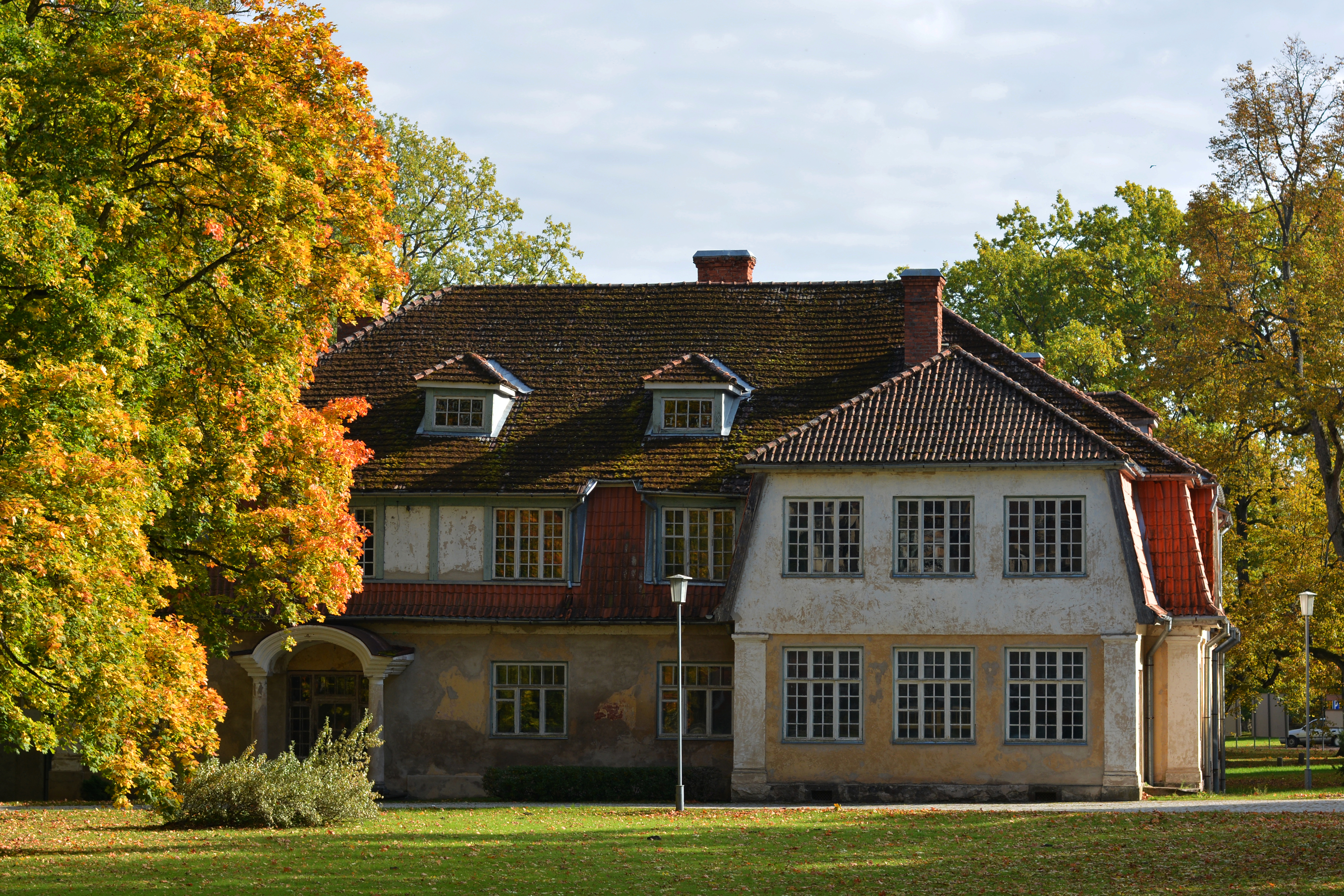
Olustvere manor manager's house

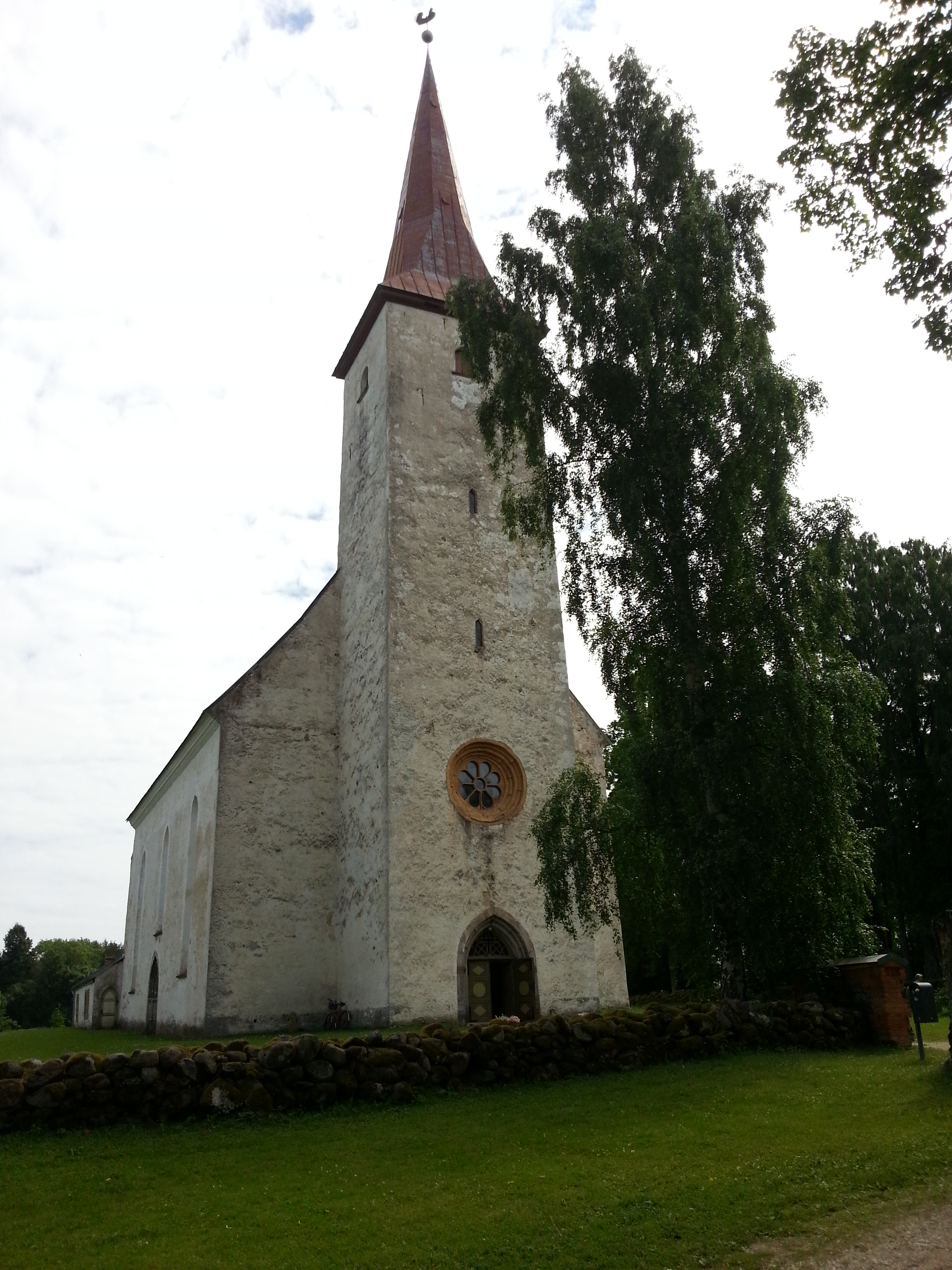
Suure-Jaani church

== See also ==
- Suure-Jaani United
