= Savimäe, Põlva County =

Village in Estonia

Coordinates: 58°12′19″N 27°19′02″E

Savimäe
- Village
- Interactive map of Savimäe
- Country: Estonia
- County: Põlva County
- Parish: Põlva Parish
- Time zone: UTC+2 (EET)
  - Summer (DST): UTC+3 (EEST)

Savimäe is a village in Põlva Parish, Põlva County in southeastern Estonia.
