= Municipalities of Estonia =

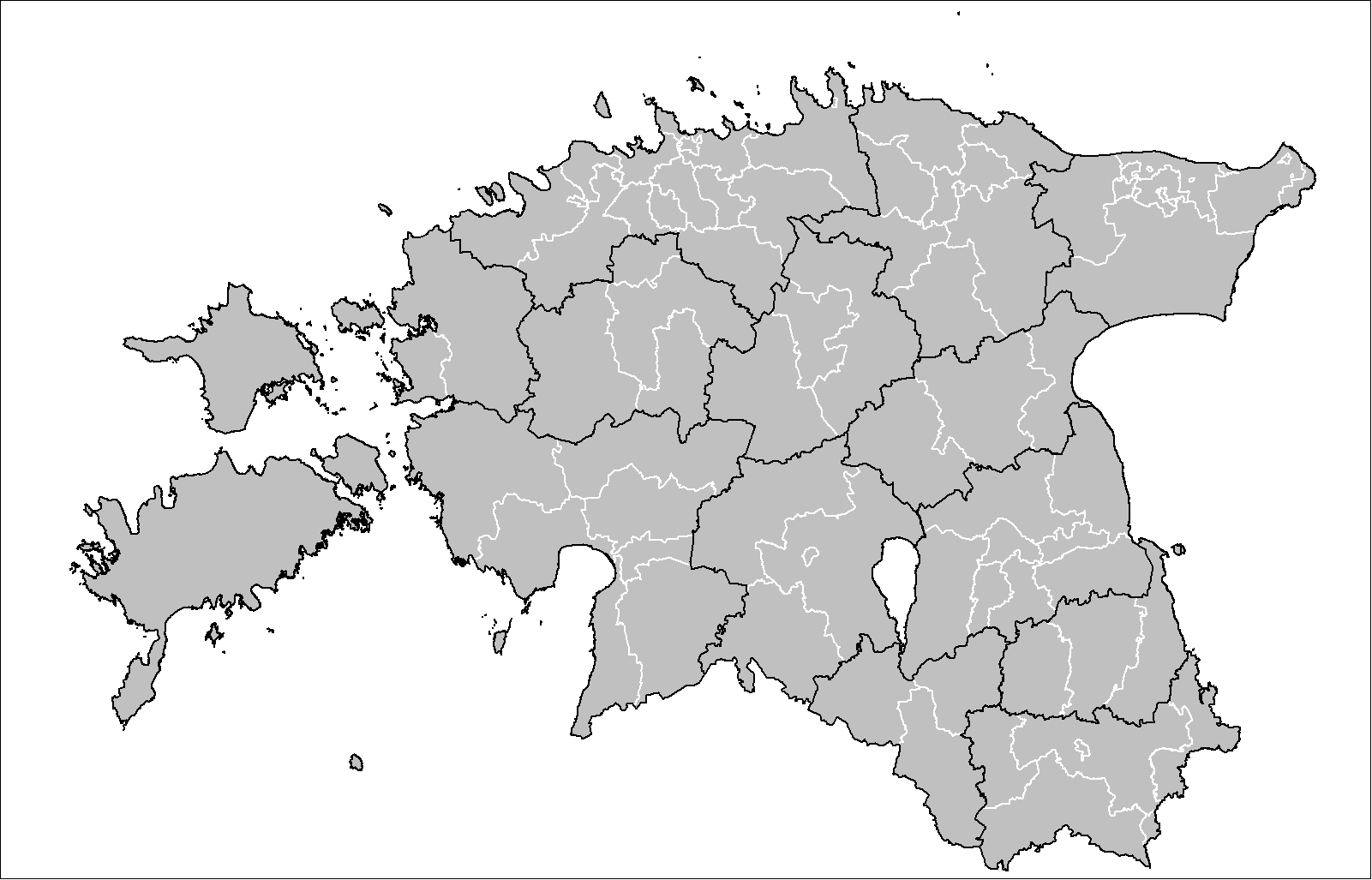
Municipalities of Estonia

A municipality (Estonian: omavalitsus, plural omavalitsused) is the smallest administrative subdivision of Estonia. Each municipality is a unit of self-government with its representative and executive bodies. The municipalities in Estonia cover the entire territory of the country.

Municipalities in Estonia are of two types:

- Urban municipalities or towns (linnad, singular linn)
- Rural municipalities or parishes (vallad, singular vald).

There is no other status distinction between them.

Municipalities may contain one or several settlements. All but 5 urban municipalities (Haapsalu, Narva-Jõesuu, Paide, Pärnu and Tartu) plus 1 rural municipality (Ruhnu) contain only one settlement. As of 2017, there are no longer any "borough-parishes", i.e. rural municipalities with only one borough-type settlement. Ruhnu Parish contains only one village and is therefore a "village-parish".

Some municipalities are divided into districts. The 8 urban districts (linnaosad, singular linnaosa) of Tallinn have limited self-government, while other urban districts are formed for administrative purposes. Some rural districts (osavallad) have limited self-government, while other types of rural districts do not.

Municipalities range in population from Tallinn with 427,500 inhabitants to Ruhnu with 68. Previously, as over two-thirds of the municipalities had a population of under 3,000, many of them found it advantageous to co-operate in providing services and carrying out administrative functions.

After the administrative reform was completed in October 2017 and a single merger in 2025, there are total of 78 municipalities, 15 of which are urban and 63 rural. 50 of the present municipalities were the result of mergers, 28 remain unchanged. After the reform small municipalities with under 5,000 inhabitants have been reduced from a number of 169 to 15. The number of councillors was reduced from 2,026 to 1,019. In 2022, 36 municipalities (45.56%) had falling population numbers.

== List ==
Name	Capital	Area (km^{2})	Population	Type	County	Flag	Coat of Arms	Map
Alutaguse	Iisaku	1,439.61	4,176	Rural	Ida-Viru County			
Anija	Kehra	520.94	6,456	Rural	Harju County			
Antsla	Antsla	411	4,200	Rural	Võru County			
Elva	Elva	732	14,863	Rural	Tartu County			
Häädemeeste	Uulu	494	4,677	Rural	Pärnu County	Tahkuranna Parish		
Haapsalu	Haapsalu	272	13,435	Urban	Lääne County			
Haljala	Võsu	183.02	4,072	Rural	Lääne-Viru County			
Harku	Tabasalu	159.77	17,294	Rural	Harju County			
Hiiumaa	Kärdla	1,023	8,474	Rural	Hiiu County			
Järva	Järva-Jaani	1,223	8,725	Rural	Järva County			
Jõelähtme	Jõelähtme	210.86	7,305	Rural	Harju County			
Jõgeva	Jõgeva	458	13,122	Rural	Jõgeva County			
Jõhvi	Jõhvi	390	16,748	Rural	Ida-Viru County			
Kadrina	Kadrina	329.36	4,799	Rural	Lääne-Viru County			
Kambja	Ülenurme	275	13,705	Rural	Tartu County			
Kanepi	Kanepi	524.68	4,453	Rural	Põlva County			
Kastre	Kurepalu	493	5,718	Rural	Tartu County			
Kehtna	Järvakandi	512	5,454	Rural	Rapla County			
Keila	Keila	11.25	10,905	Urban	Harju County			
Kihnu	Sääre	16.88	529	Rural	Pärnu County			
Kiili	Kiili	100.4	6,391	Rural	Harju County			
Kohila	Kohila	230.2	7,726	Rural	Rapla County			
Kohtla-Järve	Kohtla-Järve	68.77	33,675	Urban	Ida-Viru County			
Kose	Kose	532.85	7,754	Rural	Harju County			
Kuusalu	Kuusalu	707.97	6,380	Rural	Harju County			
Lääne-Harju	Paldiski	645.71	13,462	Rural	Harju County			
Lääne-Nigula	Taebla	1,449	6,961	Rural	Lääne County			
Lääneranna	Lihula	1,352	5,092	Rural	Pärnu County			
Loksa	Loksa	3.81	2,603	Urban	Harju County			
Lüganuse	Kiviõli	599	8,250	Rural	Ida-Viru County			
Luunja	Luunja	134	5,612	Rural	Tartu County			
Maardu	Maardu	22.76	16,750	Urban	Harju County			
Märjamaa	Märjamaa	1,164	7,405	Rural	Rapla County	Märjamaa Parish		
Muhu	Liiva	208	1,640	Rural	Saare County	Muhu Parish		
Mulgi	Abja-Paluoja	881	7,086	Rural	Viljandi County			
Mustvee	Mustvee	615	4,952	Rural	Jõgeva County			
Narva	Narva	84.54	53,875	Urban	Ida-Viru County			
Narva-Jõesuu	Narva-Jõesuu	405	4,269	Urban	Ida-Viru County			
Nõo	Nõo	170	4,289	Rural	Tartu County			
Otepää	Otepää	520	6,388	Rural	Valga County			
Paide	Paide	443	10,664	Urban	Järva County			
Pärnu	Pärnu	858	52,362	Urban	Pärnu County			
Peipsiääre	Alatskivi	652	5,059	Rural	Tartu County			
Põhja-Pärnumaa	Vändra	1,013	8,088	Rural	Pärnu County			
Põhja-Sakala	Suure-Jaani	1,153	7,748	Rural	Viljandi County			
Põltsamaa	Põltsamaa	889.56	9,665	Rural	Jõgeva County			
Põlva	Põlva	706	13,534	Rural	Põlva County			
Raasiku	Aruküla	158.86	5,284	Rural	Harju County	Raasiku Parish		
Rae	Jüri	206.7	24,276	Rural	Harju County			
Rakvere (parish)	Sõmeru	295	5,859	Rural	Lääne-Viru County			
Rakvere (town)	Rakvere	10.64	15,614	Urban	Lääne-Viru County			
Räpina	Räpina	265.93	6,049	Rural	Põlva County			
Rapla	Rapla	859	13,453	Rural	Rapla County			
Rõuge	Rõuge	933	4,865	Rural	Võru County			
Ruhnu	Ruhnu	11.9	88	Rural	Saare County			
Saarde	Kilingi-Nõmme	706.9	4,393	Rural	Pärnu County			
Saaremaa	Kuressaare	2,705	30,191	Rural	Saare County			
Saku	Saku	171.13	11,510	Rural	Harju County	Saku Parish		
Saue	Saue	628	25,370	Rural	Harju County			
Setomaa	Värska	463.18	2,823	Rural	Võru County			
Sillamäe	Sillamäe	10.54	12,452	Urban	Ida-Viru County			
Tallinn	Tallinn	159.2	453,864	Urban	Harju County			
Tapa	Tapa	480	11,082	Rural	Lääne-Viru County			
Tartu (parish)	Kõrveküla	742	12,420	Rural	Tartu County			
Tartu (city)	Tartu	154	100,724	Urban	Tartu County			
Tori	Sindi	611	12,203	Rural	Pärnu County			
Tõrva	Tõrva	647	5,862	Rural	Valga County			
Türi	Türi	1,008	10,683	Rural	Järva County			
Väike-Maarja	Väike-Maarja	457.39	5,653	Rural	Lääne-Viru County			
Valga	Valga	750	15,864	Rural	Valga County			
Viimsi	Viimsi	72.84	22,472	Rural	Harju County			
Viljandi (parish)	Viljandi	651	13,450	Rural	Viljandi County			
Viljandi (town)	Viljandi	14.62	17,353	Urban	Viljandi County			
Vinni	Pajusti	486.65	6,716	Rural	Lääne-Viru County			
Viru-Nigula	Kunda	312	5,813	Rural	Lääne-Viru County	Viru-Nigula Parish		
Vormsi	Hullo	92.93	292	Rural	Lääne County			
Võru (parish)	Võru	952	10,374	Rural	Võru County			
Võru (town)	Võru	13.24	12,055	Urban	Võru County			

== Gallery of Maps ==
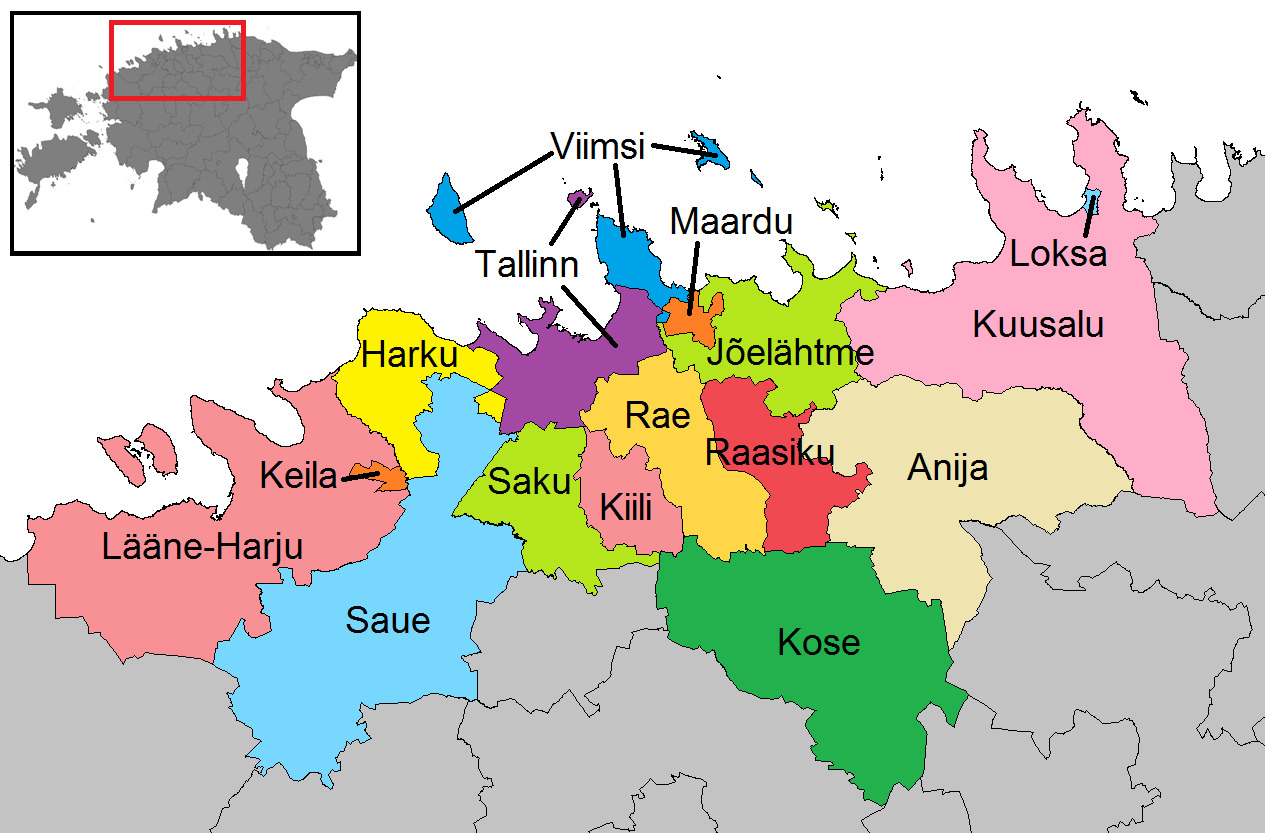
Municipalities of Harju County

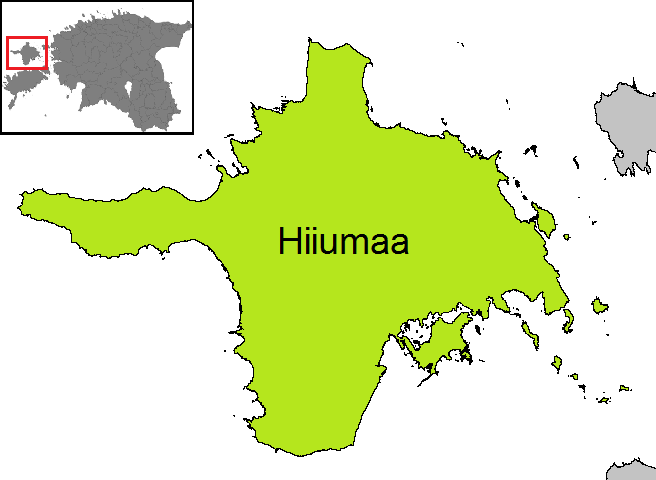
Hiiumaa Parish, the only municipality of Hiiu County

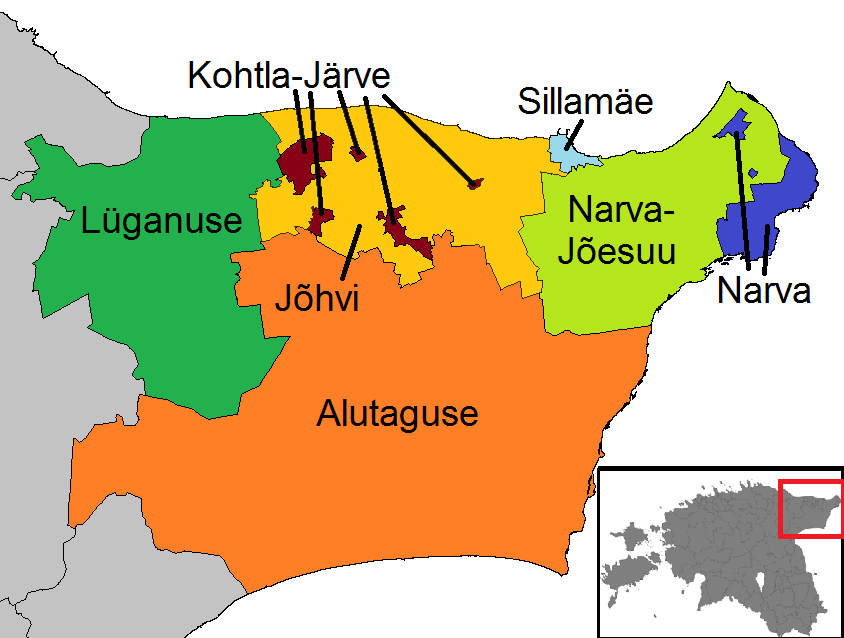
Municipalities of Ida-Viru County

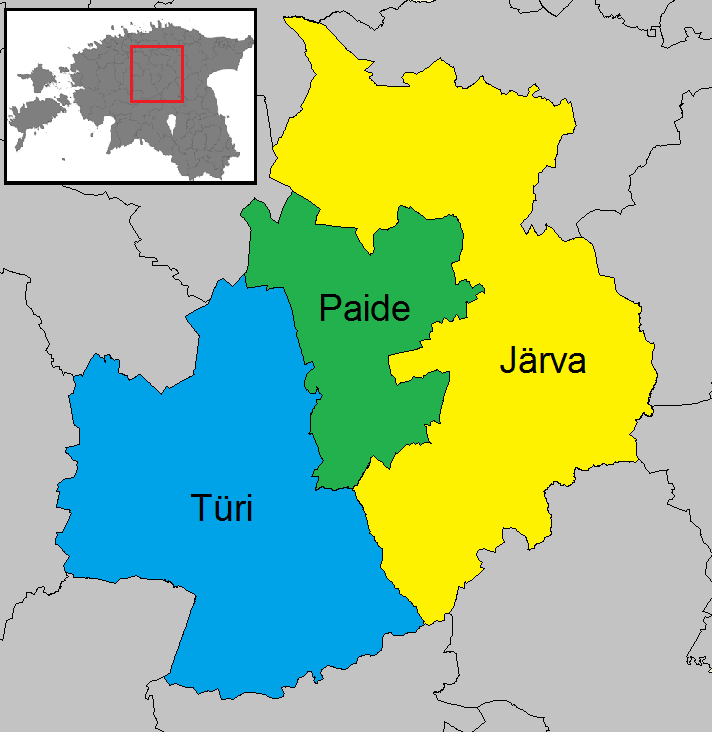
Municipalities of Järva County

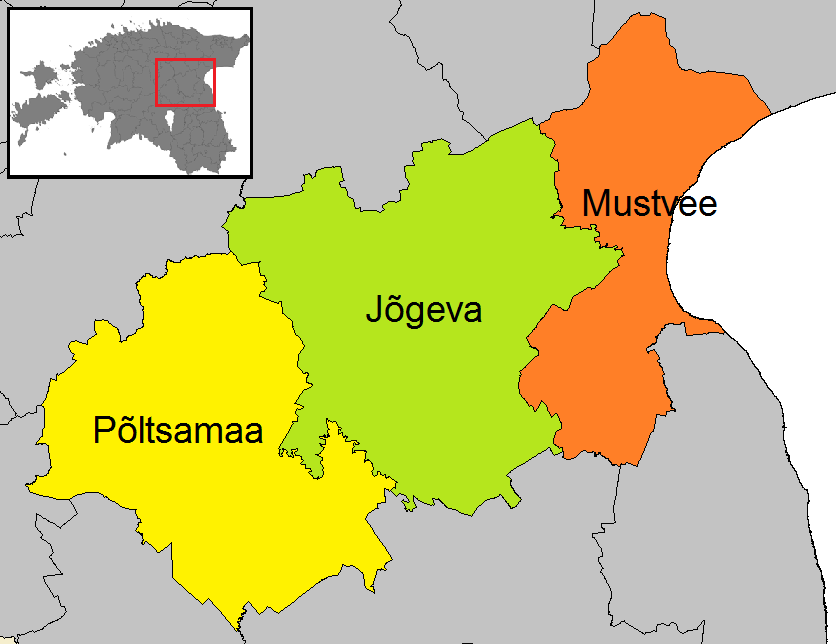
Municipalities of Jõgeva County

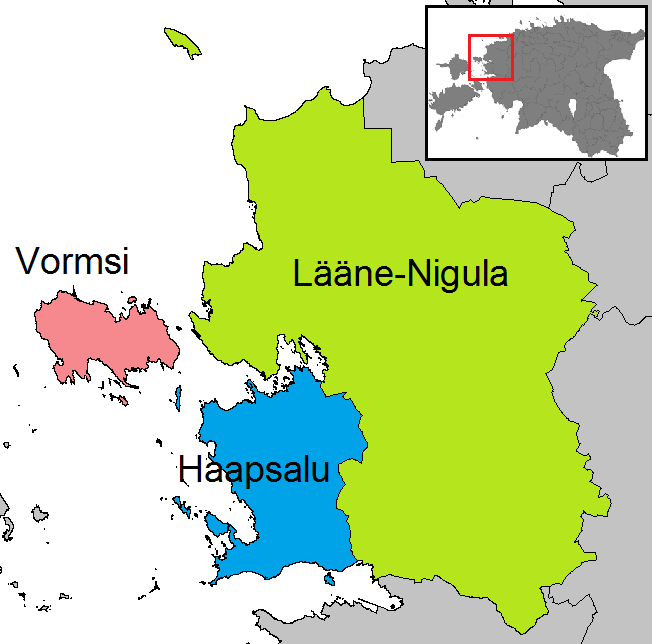
Municipalities of Lääne County

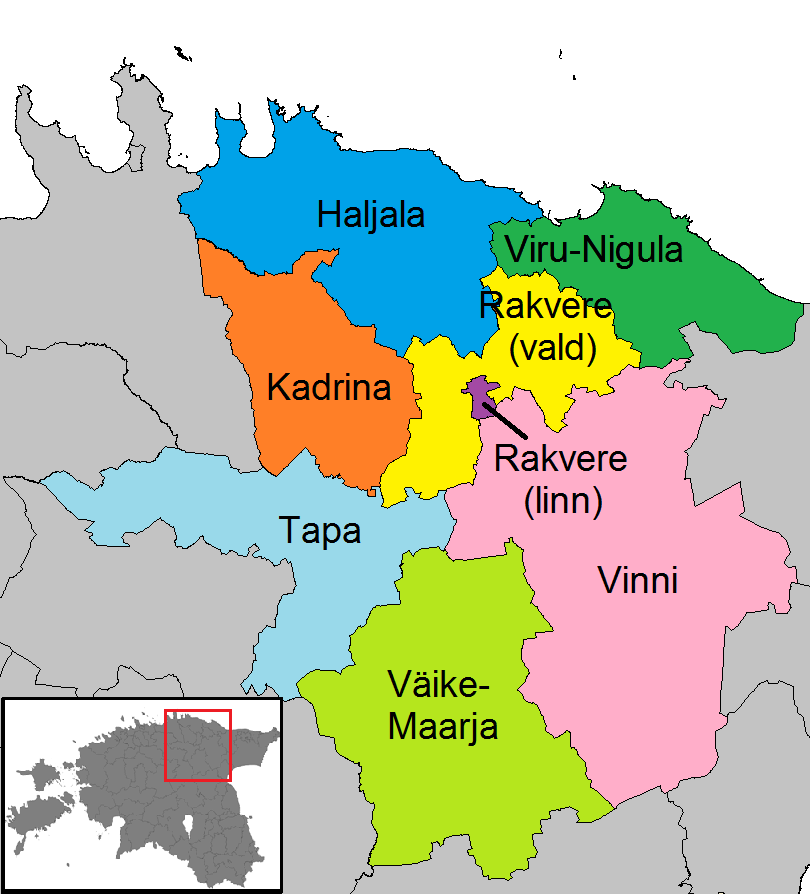
Municipalities of Lääne-Viru County

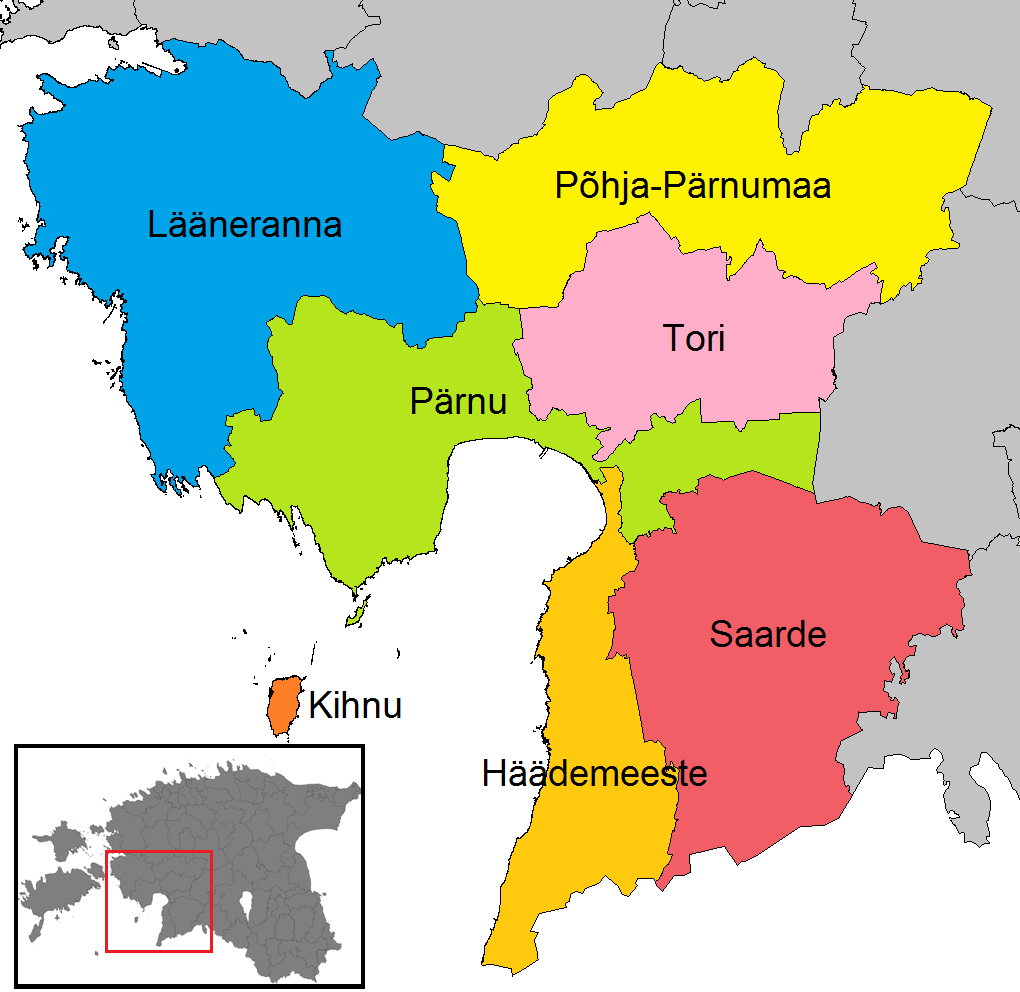
Municipalities of Pärnu County

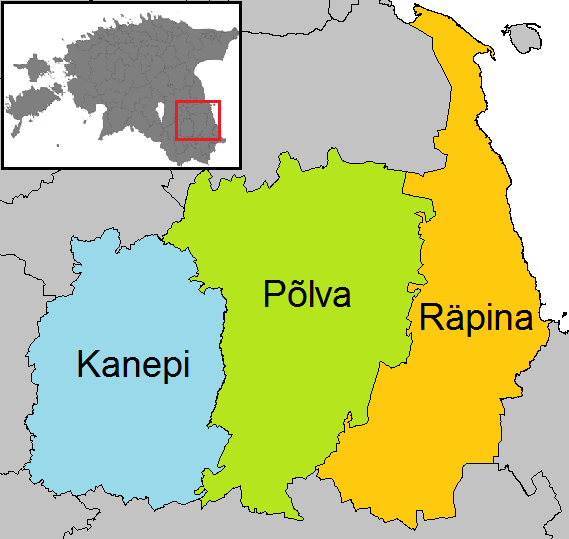
Municipalities of Põlva County

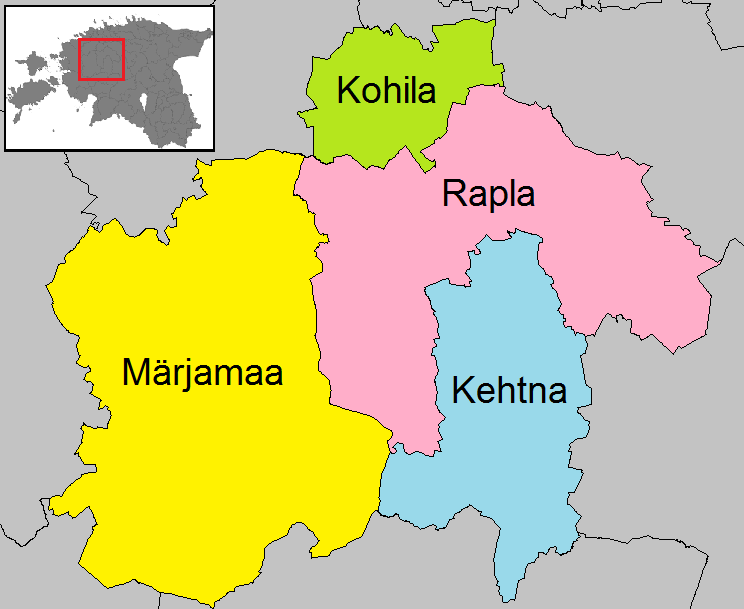
Municipalities of Rapla County

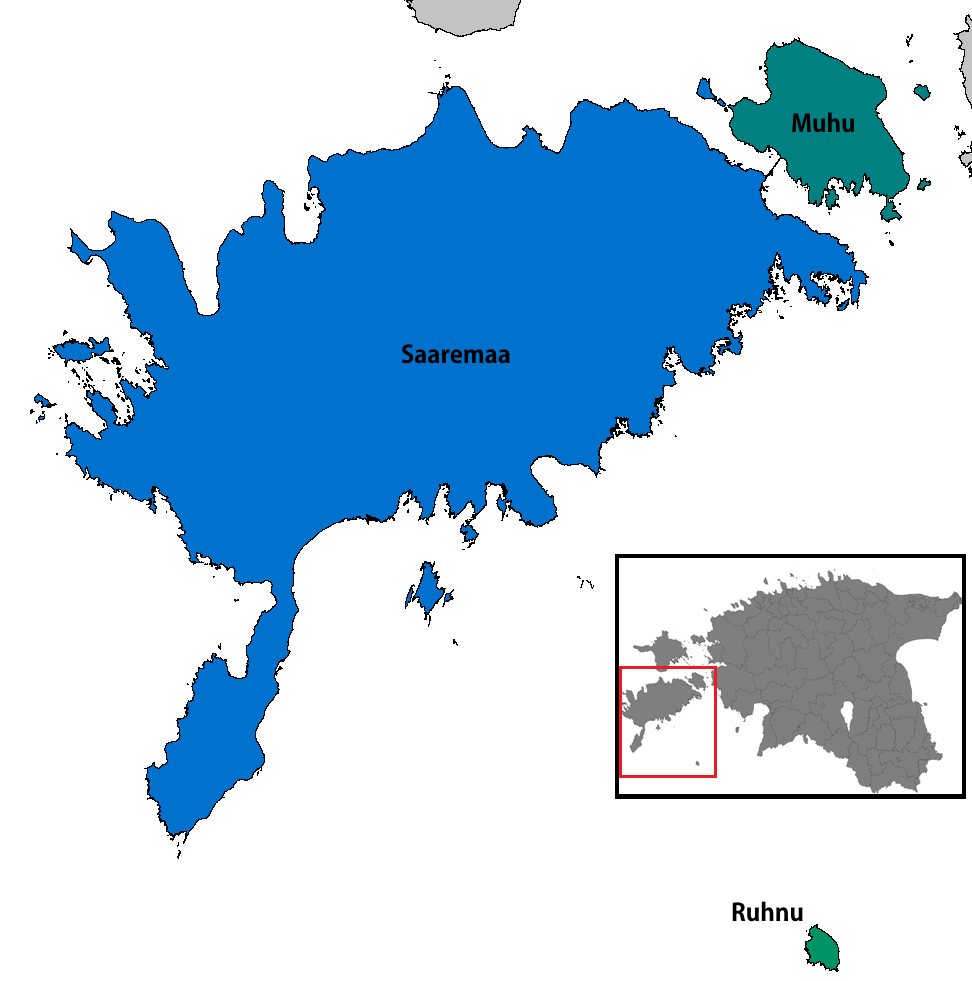
Municipalities of Saare County

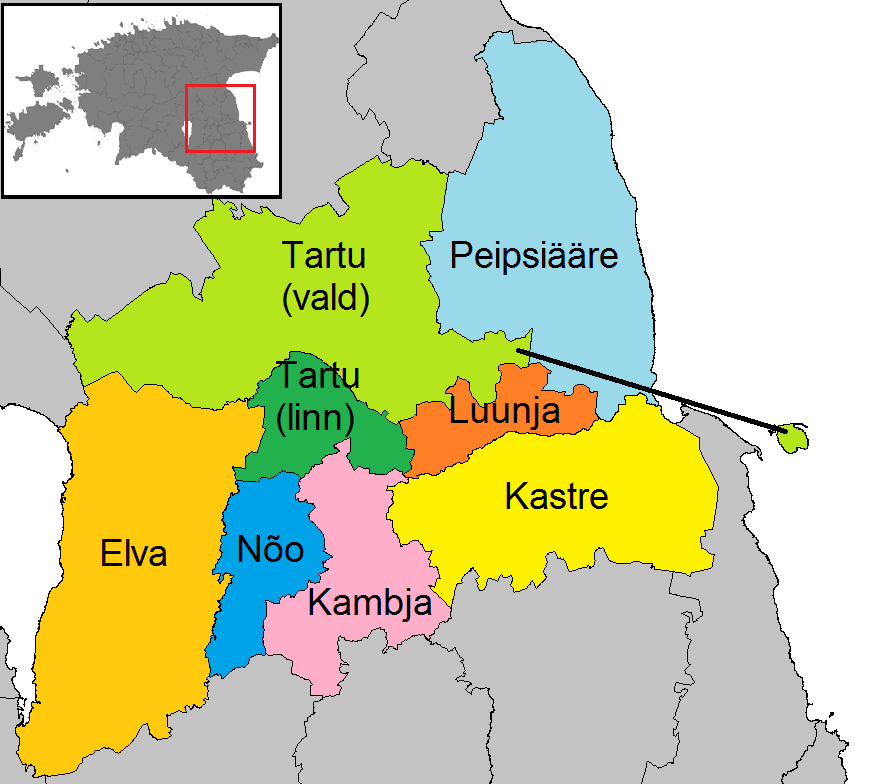
Municipalities of Tartu County

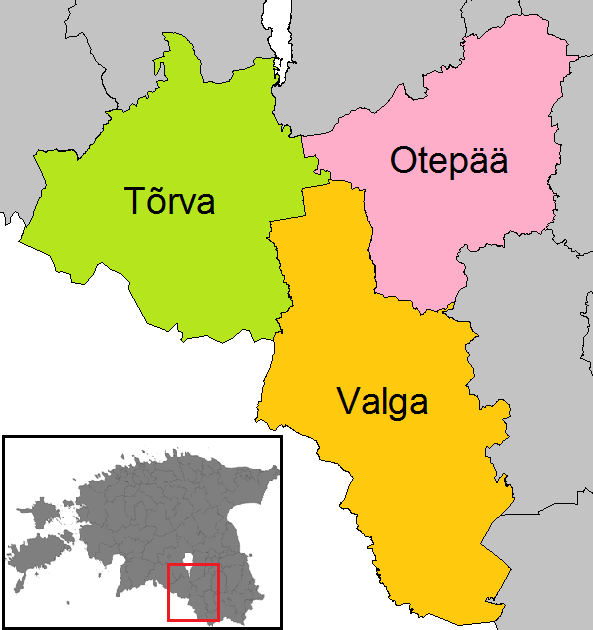
Municipalities of Valga County

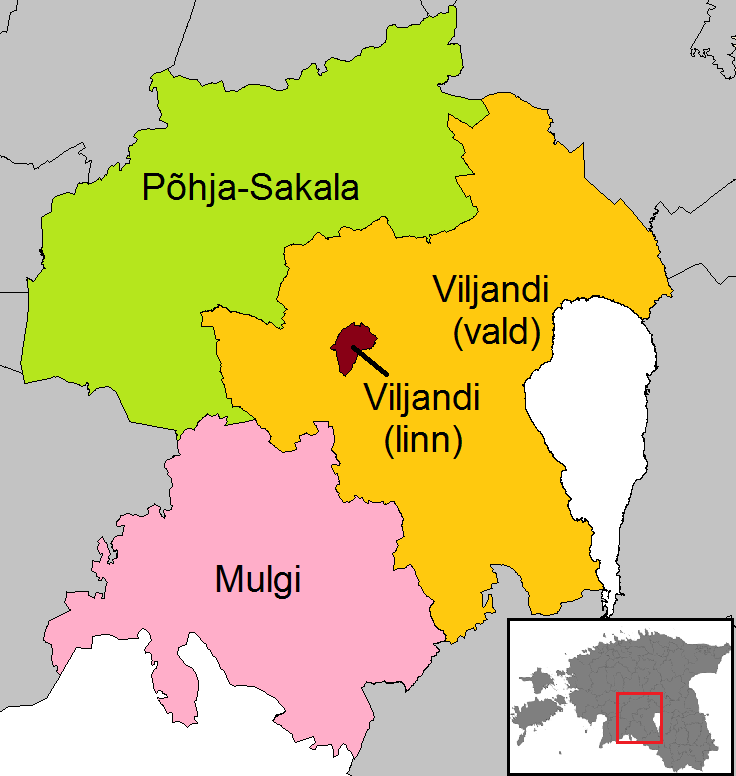
Municipalities of Viljandi County

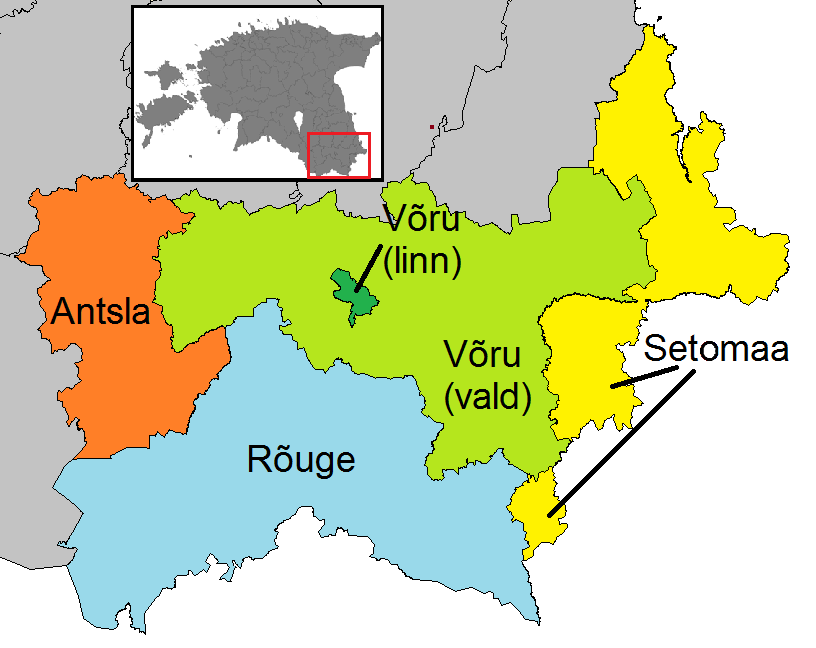
Municipalities of Võru County

== Structure of local authorities ==
In each municipality there is a local government as well as a council.

The council (volikogu) is a representative body elected by the residents of a municipality for a term of three years. The members of the council elect a chairman (volikogu esimees), who organises the council's work and represents the municipality.

The government (valitsus) is an executive body formed by the council. It is headed by a mayor (linnapea in towns, vallavanem in parishes), who is appointed for a four-year term. The mayor cannot be the chairman of the council. Other members of the government are chosen by the mayor with the approval of the council.

== Former municipalities ==
The list of municipalities that have merged or lost existence between 1995 and 2025.

- 1996
  - Pärnu-Jaagupi borough was merged into Halinga Parish
- 1998
  - Abja-Paluoja town was merged into Abja Parish
- 1999
  - Otepää town and Pühajärve Parish formed Otepää Parish
  - Lihula town was merged into Lihula Parish
  - Võsu borough was merged into Vihula Parish
  - Karksi-Nuia town was merged into Karksi Parish
  - Kaarma Parish and Kuressaare Parish formed Kaarma Parish
  - Antsla town was merged into Antsla Parish
- 2002
  - Kehra town was merged into Anija Parish
  - Rapla town was merged into Rapla Parish
  - Räpina town was merged into Räpina Parish
  - Kohila borough was merged into Kohila Parish
  - Märjamaa borough, Märjamaa Parish and Loodna Parish formed Märjamaa Parish
- 2005
  - Tapa town, Saksi Parish and Lehtse Parish formed Tapa Parish
  - Jõhvi town was merged into Jõhvi Parish
  - Kuusalu Parish and Loksa Parish formed Kuusalu Parish
  - Kilingi-Nõmme town, Saarde Parish and Tali Parish formed Saarde Parish
  - Suure-Jaani town, Olustvere Parish, Suure-Jaani Parish and Vastemõisa Parish formed Suure-Jaani Parish
  - Türi town, Türi Parish, Oisu Parish and Kabala Parish formed Türi Parish
  - Tamsalu town was merged into Tamsalu Parish
- 2009
  - Kaisma Parish and Vändra Parish formed Vändra Parish
- 2013
  - Pärsti Parish, Paistu Parish, Viiratsi Parish and Saarepeedi Parish formed Viljandi Parish
  - Põlva town was merged into Põlva Parish
  - Kose Parish and Kõue Parish formed Kose Parish
  - Lavassaare borough was merged into Audru Parish
  - Kärdla town and Kõrgessaare Parish formed Hiiu Parish
  - Oru Parish, Risti Parish and Taebla Parish formed Lääne-Nigula Parish
  - Püssi town, Maidla Parish and Lüganuse Parish formed Lüganuse Parish
- 2014
  - Kaarma Parish, Kärla Parish and Lümanda Parish formed Lääne-Saare Parish
- 2017
  - Aegviidu borough was merged into Anija Parish
  - Keila Parish, Padise Parish, Vasalemma Parish and Paldiski town formed Lääne-Harju Parish
  - Saue town, Saue Parish, Kernu Parish and Nissi Parish formed Saue Parish
  - Hiiu Parish, Emmaste Parish, Käina Parish and Pühalepa Parish formed Hiiumaa Parish
  - Kiviõli town, Lüganuse Parish and Sonda Parish formed Lüganuse Parish
  - Alajõe Parish, Iisaku Parish, Illuka Parish, Mäetaguse Parish and Tudulinna Parish formed Alutaguse Parish
  - Toila Parish, Kohtla Parish and Kohtla-Nõmme borough formed Toila Parish
  - Narva-Jõesuu town and Vaivara Parish formed Narva-Jõesuu (urban municipality)
  - Albu Parish, Ambla Parish, Imavere Parish, Järva-Jaani, Kareda Parish, Koeru Parish and Koigi Parish formed Järva Parish
  - Türi Parish, Väätsa Parish and Käru Parish formed Türi Parish
  - Paide town, Paide Parish and Roosna-Alliku Parish formed Paide (urban municipality)
  - Jõgeva town, Jõgeva Parish, Palamuse Parish, most of Torma Parish and some parts of Puurmani Parish formed Jõgeva Parish
  - Põltsamaa town, Põltsamaa Parish, Pajusi Parish and most of Puurmani Parish formed Põltsamaa Parish
  - Mustvee town, Kasepää Parish, Saare Parish, Lohusuu Parish, Avinurme Parish and some parts of Torma Parish formed Mustvee Parish
  - Haapsalu town and Ridala Parish formed Haapsalu (urban municipality)
  - Lääne-Nigula Parish, Martna Parish, Kullamaa Parish, Nõva Parish and Noarootsi Parish formed Lääne-Nigula Parish
  - Viru-Nigula Parish, Aseri Parish and Kunda town formed Viru-Nigula Parish
  - Haljala Parish and Vihula Parish formed Haljala Parish
  - Rakvere Parish and Sõmeru Parish formed Rakvere Parish
  - Tapa Parish and Tamsalu Parish formed Tapa Parish
  - Väike-Maarja Parish and Rakke Parish formed Väike-Maarja Parish
  - Vinni Parish, Laekvere Parish and Rägavere Parish formed Vinni Parish
  - Pärnu town, Audru Parish, Tõstamaa Parish and Paikuse Parish formed Pärnu (urban municipality)
  - Lihula Parish, Hanila Parish, Koonga Parish and Varbla Parish formed Lääneranna Parish
  - Halinga Parish, Vändra Parish, Vändra borough and Tootsi borough formed Põhja-Pärnumaa Parish
  - Tori Parish, Are Parish, Sauga Parish and Sindi town formed Tori Parish
  - Häädemeeste Parish and Tahkuranna Parish formed Häädemeeste Parish
  - Saarde Parish and Surju Parish formed Saarde Parish
  - Põlva Parish, Laheda Parish, Ahja Parish, Mooste Parish and Vastse-Kuuste Parish formed Põlva Parish
  - Kanepi Parish, Valgjärve Parish and Kõlleste Parish formed Kanepi Parish
  - Räpina Parish, Veriora Parish and Meeksi Parish formed Räpina Parishˇ
  - Rapla Parish, Juuru Parish, Kaiu Parish and most of Raikküla Parish formed Rapla Parish
  - Märjamaa Parish, Vigala Parish and some parts of Raikküla Parish formed Märjamaa Parish
  - Kehtna Parish and Järvakandi borough formed Kehtna Parish
  - Kuressaare town, Lääne-Saare Parish, Salme Parish, Torgu Parish, Kihelkonna Parish, Mustjala Parish, Leisi Parish, Pihtla Parish, Valjala Parish, Orissaare Parish, Pöide Parish and Laimjala Parish formed Saaremaa Parish
  - Tartu town and Tähtvere Parish formed Tartu (urban municipality)
  - Elva town, Konguta Parish, Rannu Parish, Rõngu Parish, Puhja Parish and parts of Puka Parish and Palupera Parish formed Elva Parish
  - Tartu Parish, Laeva Parish, Piirissaare Parish and Tabivere Parish formed Tartu Parish
  - Kallaste town, Peipsiääre Parish, Alatskivi Parish, Vara Parish and Pala Parish formed Peipsiääre Parish
  - Kambja Parish and Ülenurme Parish formed Kambja Parish
  - Haaslava Parish, Mäksa Parish and Võnnu Parish formed Kastre Parish
  - Valga town, Karula Parish, Taheva Parish, Tõlliste Parish and Õru Parish formed Valga Parish
  - Otepää Parish, Sangaste Parish and parts of Puka Parish and Palupera Parish formed Otepää Parish
  - Tõrva town, Helme Parish, Hummuli Parish and Põdrala Parish formed Tõrva Parish
  - Viljandi Parish, Tarvastu Parish and Kolga-Jaani Parish formed Viljandi Parish
  - Suure-Jaani Parish, Kõpu Parish, Kõo Parish and Võhma town formed Põhja-Sakala Parish
  - Abja Parish, Karksi Parish, Halliste Parish and Mõisaküla town formed Mulgi Parish
  - Võru Parish, Lasva Parish, Sõmerpalu Parish, Vastseliina Parish and Orava Parish formed Võru Parish
  - Antsla Parish and Urvaste Parish formed Antsla Parish
  - Rõuge Parish, Haanja Parish, Varstu Parish, Mõniste Parish and most of Misso Parish formed Rõuge Parish
  - Meremäe Parish, Värska Parish, Mikitamäe Parish and some parts of Misso Parish formed Setomaa Parish
- 2025
  - Jõhvi Parish and Toila Parish formed Jõhvi Parish

=== Former municipalities (before 1990) ===
- Vaoküla Parish (existed 1939–1950)

== See also ==
- Counties of Estonia
- Populated places in Estonia
