= Saare Parish =

Former municipality of Estonia

Coordinates: 58.698°N 26.841°E

Saare Parish Saare vald
- Former municipality of Estonia
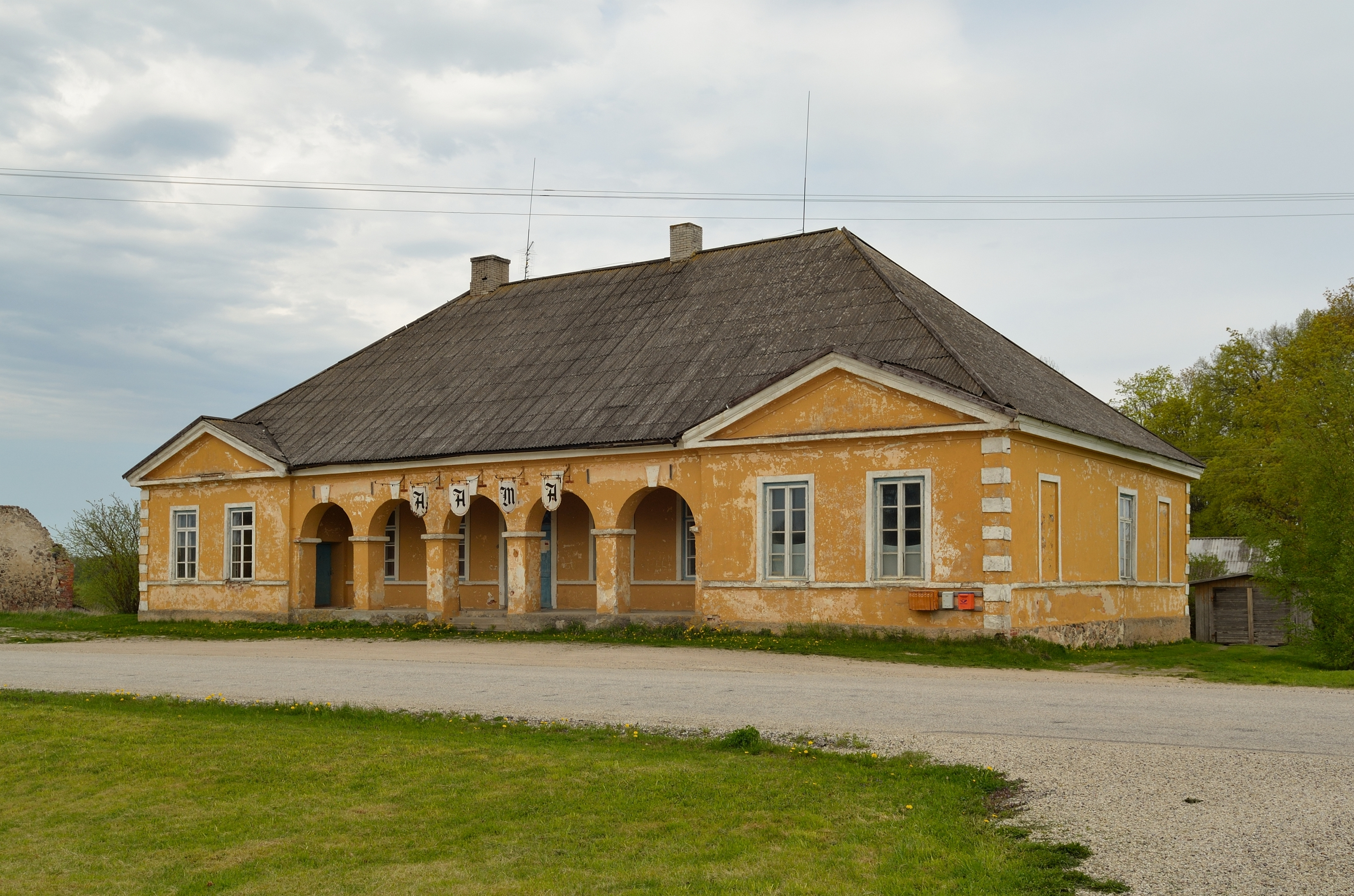
- Former Torma post station

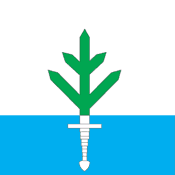
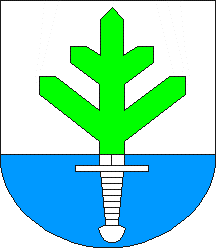
- Flag Coat of arms

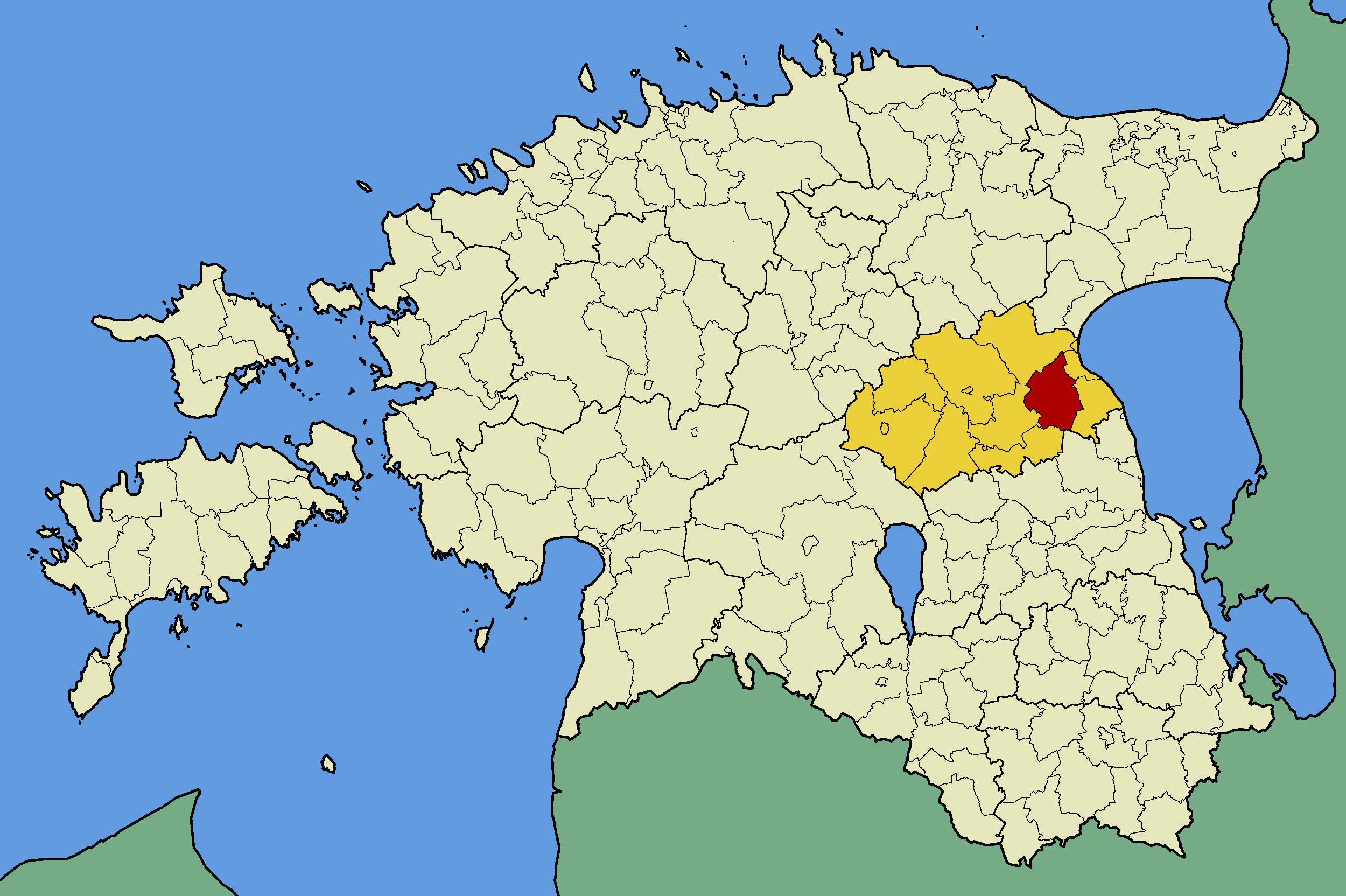
- Saare Parish within Jõgeva County.
- Country: Estonia
- County: Jõgeva County
- Administrative centre: Kääpa

Area
  - Total: 224.7 km^{2} (86.8 sq mi)

Population (2007)
  - Total: 1,391
  - Density: 6.190/km^{2} (16.03/sq mi)
- Website: www.saarevv.ee

Saare (Estonian: Saare vald) was a rural municipality of Estonia, in Jõgeva County. It had a population of 1,391 (2007) and an area of 224.7 km².

== Villages ==
Saare Parish had 22 villages: Halliku (54), Jaama (70), Kääpa (206), Kallivere (27), Kiisli (33), Koseveski (46), Levala (32), Maardla (37), Nautrasi (20), Odivere (82), Pällu (63), Pedassaare (15), Putu (52), Ruskavere (59), Saarjärve (33), Sirguvere (48), Tarakvere (15), Tuulavere (20), Vanassaare (46), Vassevere (45), Veia (47), Voore (341).
