= Avinurme Parish =

Former municipality of Estonia

Avinurme Parish Avinurme vald
- Former municipality
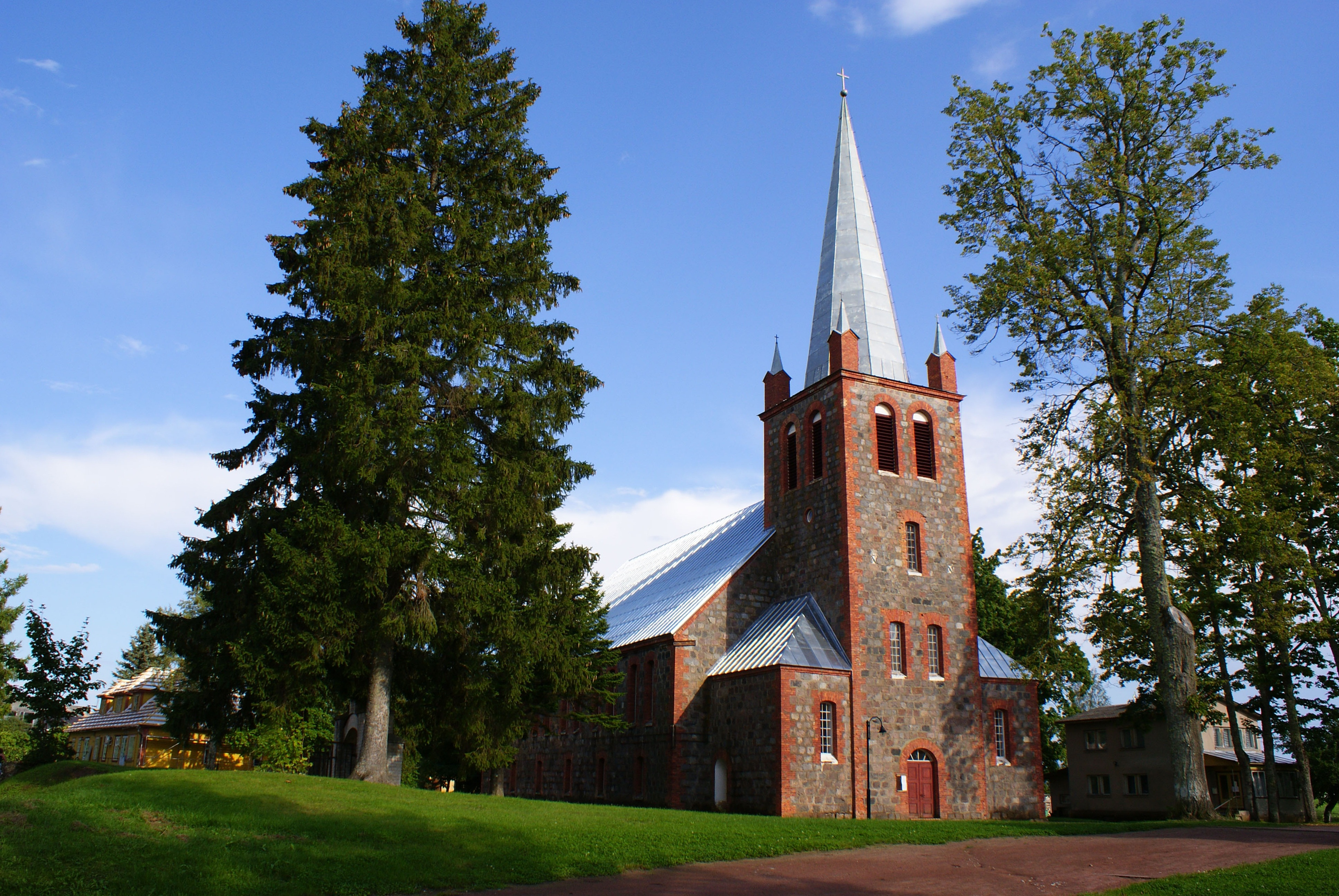
- Avinurme church

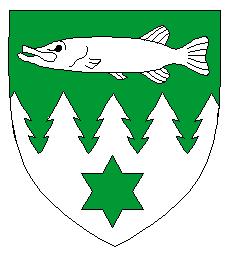
- Flag Coat of arms

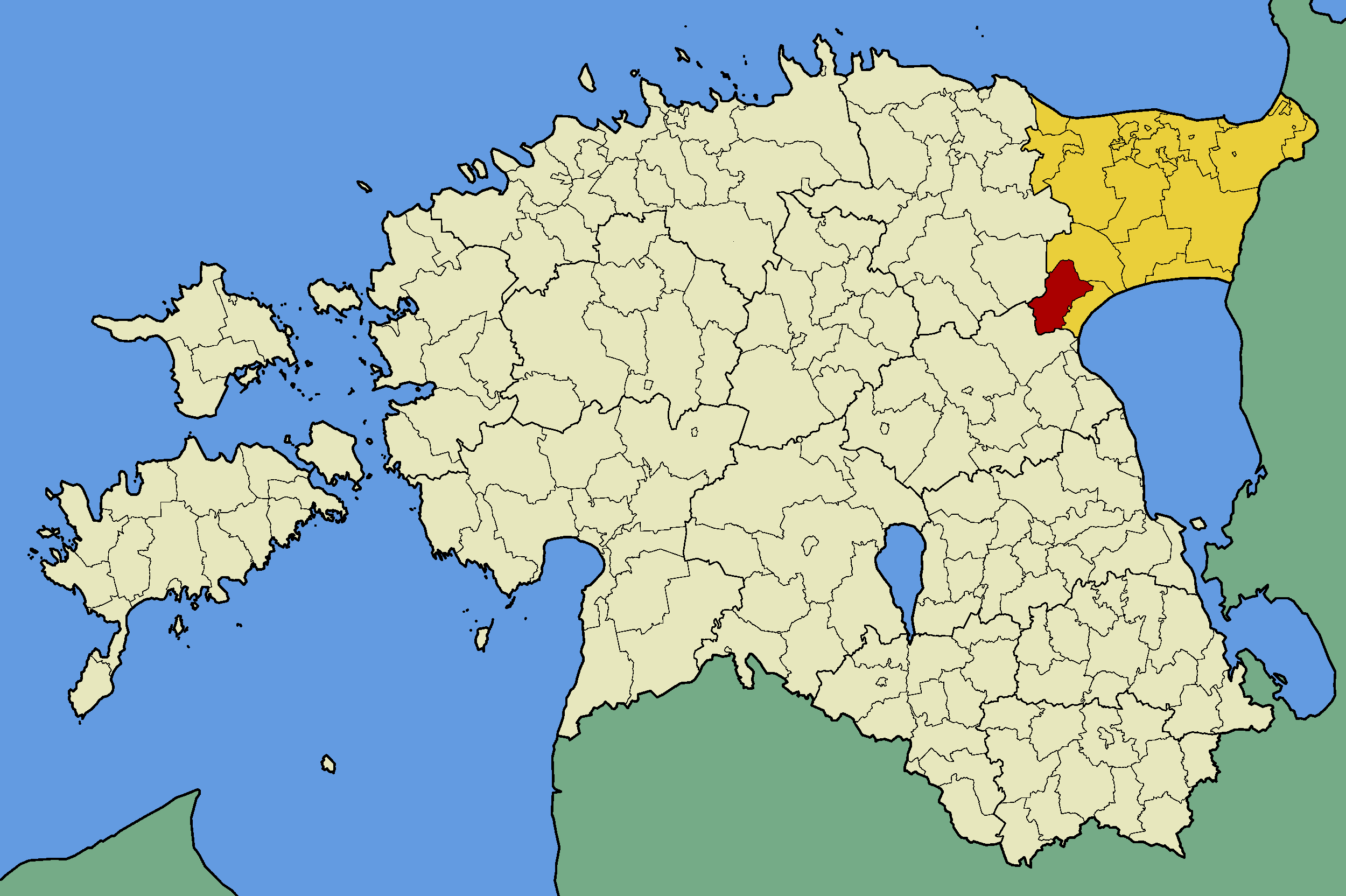
- Avinurme Parish within Ida-Viru County.
- Country: Estonia
- County: Ida-Viru County
- Administrative centre: Avinurme

Area
  - Total: 190 km^{2} (73 sq mi)

Population (2017)
  - Total: 1,245
  - Density: 6.6/km^{2} (17/sq mi)
- Website: www.avinurme.ee

Avinurme Parish was a rural municipality of Ida-Viru County in northern Estonia. It had a population of 1536 and an area of 190 km^{2} (73.36 sq mi).

Avinurme Parish was re-created in 13.02.1992 as it did exist before Soviet occupation and then disbanded in 1950. With administrative reform in Estonia in 2017 it was incorporated to Mustvee Parish. During this reform, Avinurme Parish moved from Ida-Viru County to Jõgeva County.

== Economy ==
Traditionally this region of Estonia has had strong timber industry. It has also been the biggest employer of parish.

== Settlements ==
Small borough

Avinurme

Villages

Adraku, Alekere, Änniksaare, Kaevussaare, Kiissa, Kõrve, Kõrvemetsa, Kõveriku, Laekannu, Lepiksaare, Maetsma, Paadenurme, Sälliksaare, Tammessaare, Ulvi, Vadi

== Demographics ==
01.04.1939 Avinurme vald (1939) had 4488 residents and in 01.01.2017 it was 1245. These however should not be compared one to one was there was significant changes within this period with parish borders and villages.
