= Kasepää Parish =

Former municipality of Estonia

Coordinates: 58.78945°N 26.96572°E

Kasepää Parish Kasepää vald
- Former municipality of Estonia
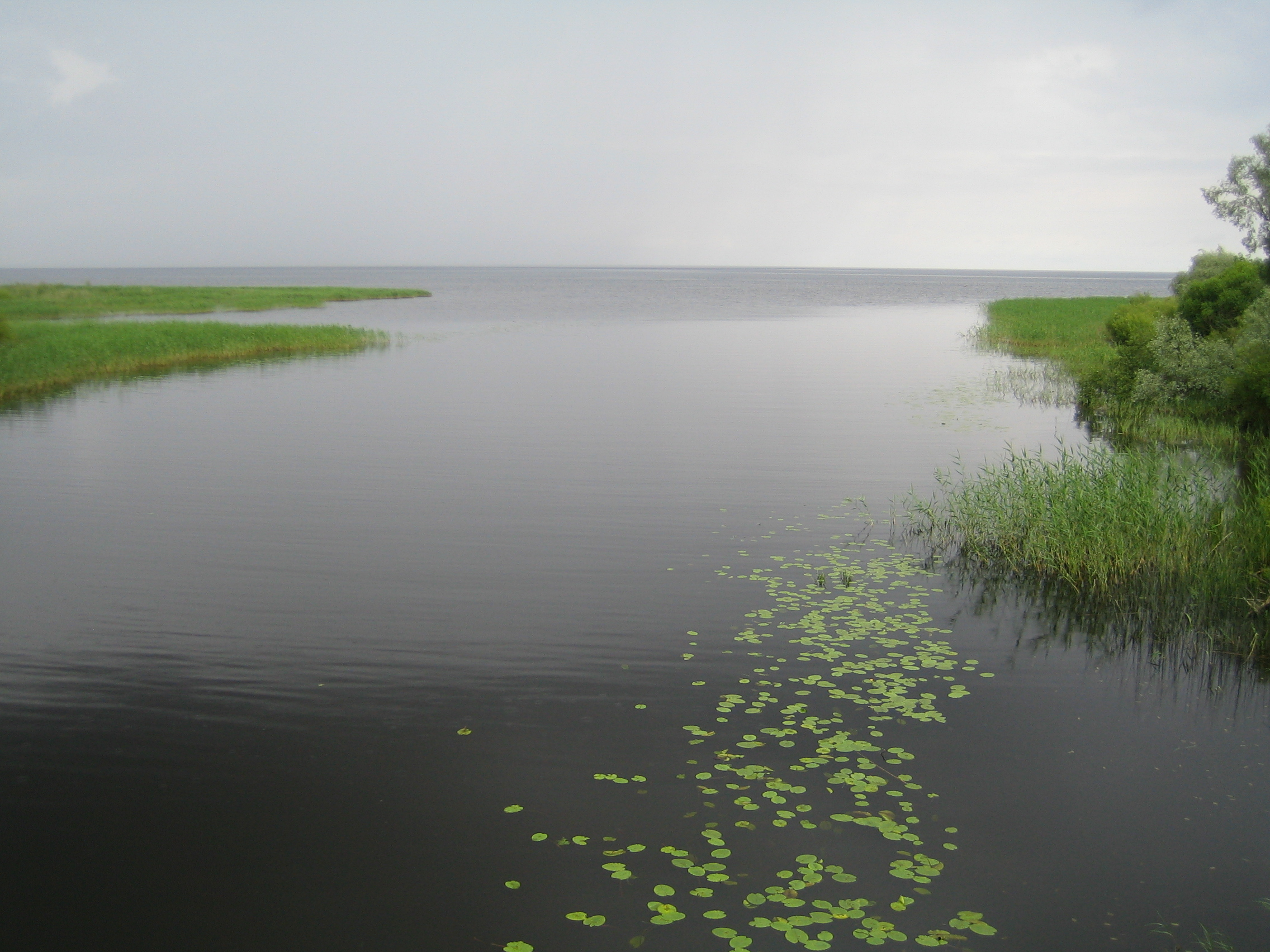

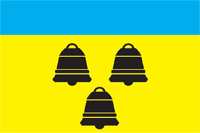
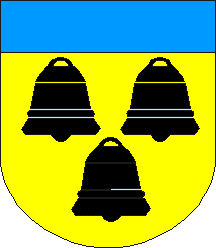
- Flag Coat of arms

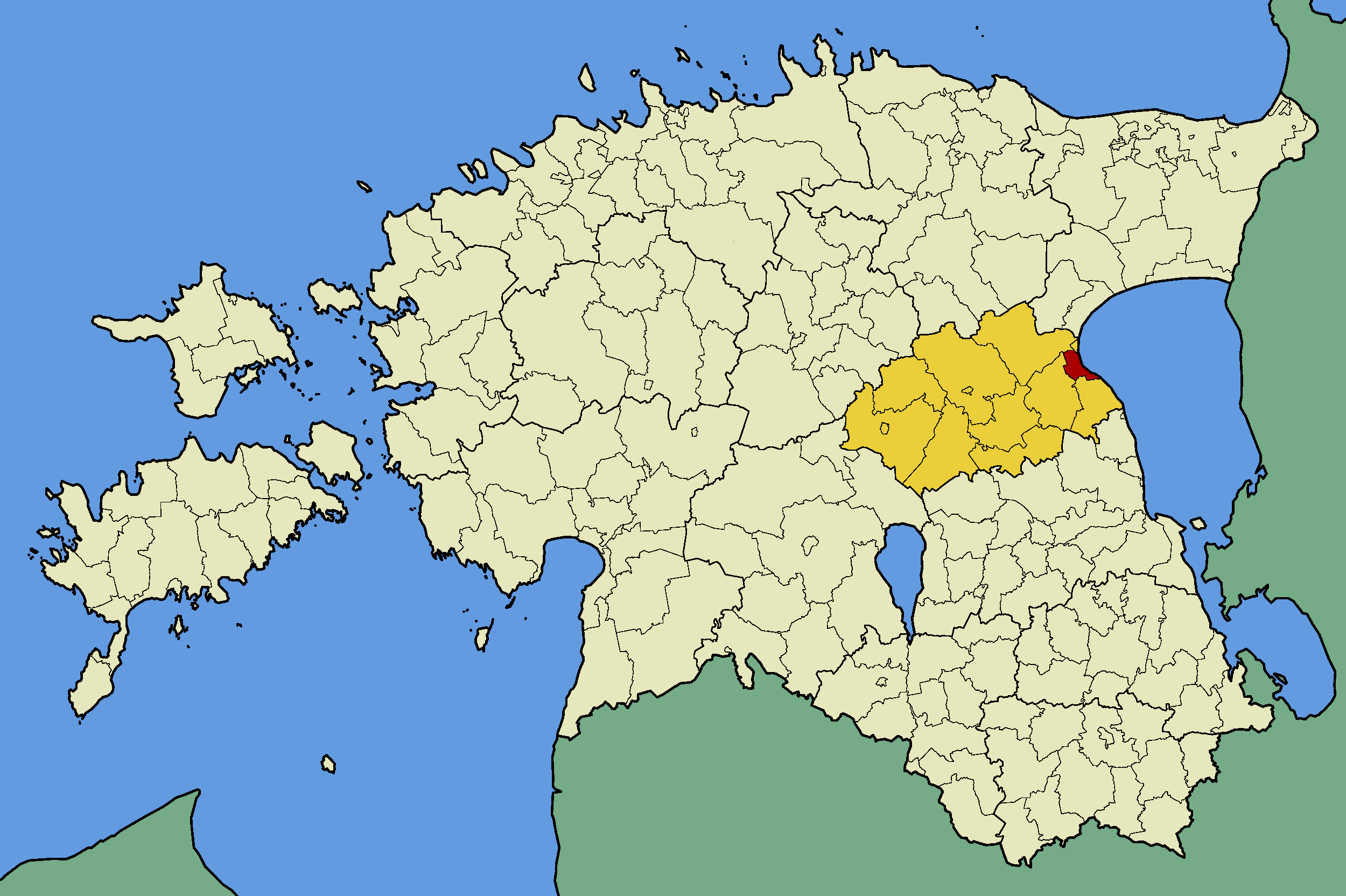
- Kasepää Parish within Jõgeva County.
- Country: Estonia
- County: Jõgeva County
- Administrative centre: Raja

Government
  - Parish Elder: Jüri Vooder (IRL)

Area
  - Total: 40.87 km^{2} (15.78 sq mi)

Population (2003)
  - Total: 1,381
  - Density: 33.79/km^{2} (87.52/sq mi)
- Website: www.kasepaa.ee

Kasepää (Estonian: Kasepää vald) was a rural municipality of Estonia, in Jõgeva County. It had a population of 1,381 (2003) and an area of 40.87 km^{2} (15.78 sq mi).

== Villages ==
Kaasiku, Kasepää, Kükita, Metsaküla, Nõmme, Omedu, Raja and Tiheda.
