= Ulvi =

Ulvi may refer to:

Places

- Ulvi, Jõgeva County, village in Mustvee Parish, Jõgeva County, Estonia
- Ulvi, Lääne-Viru County, village in Vinni Parish, Lääne-Viru County, Estonia

People

- Ulvi Cemal Erkin (1906–1972), Turkish musician
- Ulvi Rajab (1903–1938), Azerbaijani actor
- Ulvi Uraz (1921–1974), Turkish actor and director
- Ulvi Voog (born 1937), Estonian swimmer
