= Altnurga Nature Reserve =

Protected area in Estonia

- Location within Estonia
- Location: Estonia
- Coordinates: 58°33′N 26°23′E
- Area: 98 ha (240 acres)
- Established: 2015

Altnurga Nature Reserve is a nature reserve which is located in Jõgeva County, Estonia.

The area of the nature reserve is 98 ha.

The protected area was founded in 2015 to protect valuable habitat types and threatened species in Altnurga village (former Puurmani Parish).
