= Levala =

Levala may refer to several places in Estonia:

- Levala, Jõgeva County, village in Mustvee Parish, Jõgeva County
- Levala, Lääne-Viru County, village in Rakvere Parish, Lääne-Viru County
- Levala, Saare County, village in Saaremaa Parish, Saare County
