= Kõrve =

Kõrve may refer to:

== Places ==
- Kõrve, Jõgeva County, village in Mustvee Parish, Jõgeva County
- Kõrve, Võru County, village in Võru Parish, Võru County

== People ==
- Alo Kõrve (born 1978), Estonian actor
- Hele Kõrve (born 1980), Estonian actress and singer
