= Jaama =

Jaama may refer to several places in Estonia:

- Jaama, Ida-Viru County, village in Alutaguse Parish, Ida-Viru County
- Jaama, Jõgeva County, village in Mustvee Parish, Jõgeva County

== See also ==
- Kingisepp (former Finnish name was Jaama)
- Jaamaküla, village in Saarde Parish, Pärnu County
