= Sopimetsa Nature Reserve =

Protected area in Estonia

- Location within Estonia
- Location: Estonia
- Coordinates: 58°46′20″N 26°00′50″E
- Area: 4 hectares (9.9 acres)
- Established: 1968 (2013)

Sopimetsa Nature Reserve is a nature reserve which is located in Jõgeva County, Estonia.

The area of the nature reserve is four hectares (9.9 acres).

The protected area was founded in 1968 on the basis of Paeala Conservation Area. In 2013, the protected area was officially designated as a nature reserve.
