= Paadenurme Nature Reserve =

Nature reserve in Estonia

- Location within Estonia
- Location: Estonia
- Coordinates: 59°03′N 26°52′E
- Area: 345 hectares (850 acres)
- Established: 1992 (2009)

Paadenurme Nature Reserve is a nature reserve which is located in Lääne-Viru County, Estonia.

The area of the nature reserve is 345 hectares (850 acres).

The protected area was founded in 1992 to protect valuable habitat types and threatened species in Vinni, Alutaguse and Mustvee Parish. In 1997 the protected area was designated to the nature reserve.
