= Tiheda =

Village in Estonia

Coordinates: 58°47′N 26°58′E

- Village
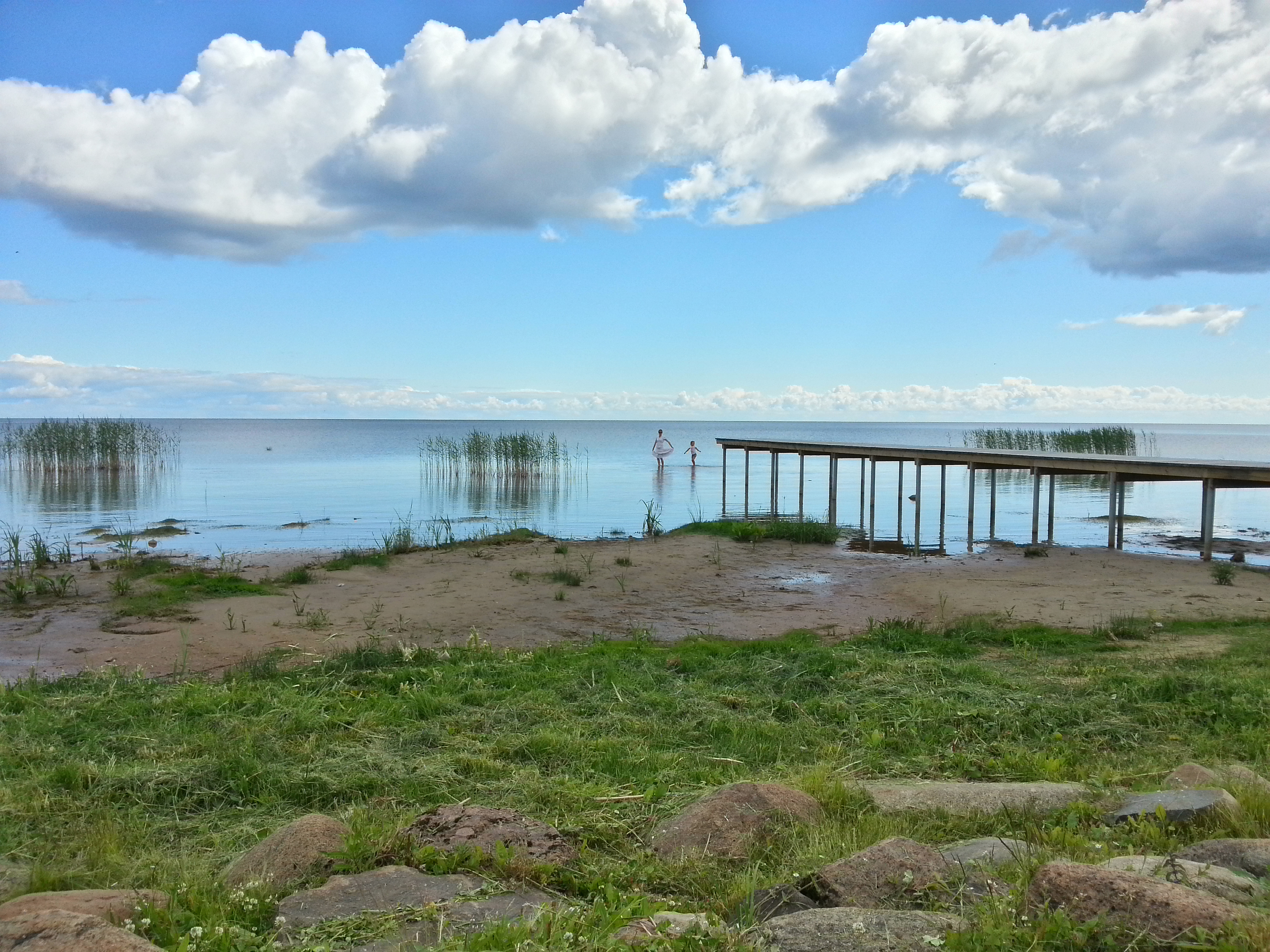
- Shore of Lake Peipus at Tiheda
- Interactive map of Tiheda
- Country: Estonia
- County: Jõgeva County
- Parish: Mustvee Parish
- Time zone: UTC+2 (EET)
  - Summer (DST): UTC+3 (EEST)

Tiheda is a village in Mustvee Parish, Jõgeva County in eastern Estonia.
