= Kallivere =

Village in Estonia

- Village
- Location in Estonia
- Coordinates: 58°43′33″N 26°41′44″E
- Country: Estonia
- County: Jõgeva County
- Municipality: Mustvee Parish

Population (2011)
  - Total: 26

Kallivere is a village in Mustvee Parish, Jõgeva County in Estonia. It's located about 8 km (5 mi) northeast of Palamuse, just before Voore, west of the Kullavere River. Kallivere has a population of 26.
