= Kaevussaare =

Village in Estonia

Coordinates: 58°58′N 26°46′E

- Village
- Interactive map of Kaevussaare
- Country: Estonia
- County: Jõgeva County
- Parish: Mustvee Parish
- Time zone: UTC+2 (EET)
  - Summer (DST): UTC+3 (EEST)

Kaevussaare is a village in Mustvee Parish, Jõgeva County in northeastern Estonia.
