= Vooremaa (newspaper) =

Estonian newspaper

- Language: Estonian
- Website: https://www.vooremaa.ee/

Vooremaa is a newspaper published in Estonia. It's the official newspaper of Jõgeva County.
