= Kasepää, Jõgeva County =

Village in Estonia

Coordinates: 58°47′16″N 26°58′01″E

Kasepää
- Village
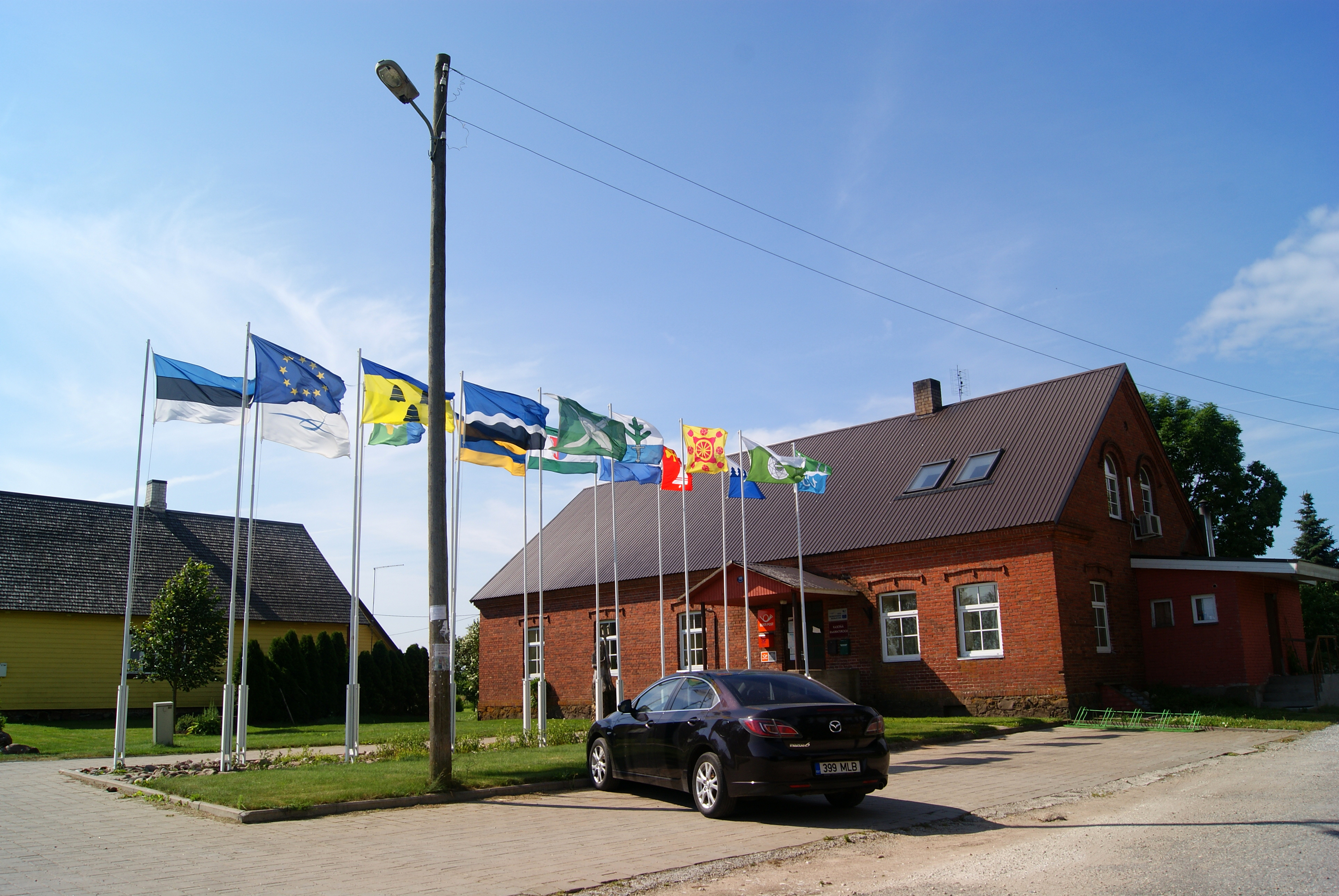
- Interactive map of Kasepää
- Country: Estonia
- County: Jõgeva County
- Parish: Mustvee Parish
- Time zone: UTC+2 (EET)
  - Summer (DST): UTC+3 (EEST)

Drone video of Kasepää village, part of 7 kilometer long "one street village" (comprising Raja, Kükita, Tiheda, Kasepää villages, also called "onion road") on the shore of Lake Peipus in July 2022

Kasepää is a village in Mustvee Parish, Jõgeva County in eastern Estonia.

== Places to eat? ==
1. Kohvik Kuld - A restaurant in Tartu mnt 2, Raja, 49509 Jõgeva maakond, Estonia. Dine-in and takeaway services available. It remains open from 10 am till 6 in the evening.
2. Kuldkala - A restaurant in Nõmme, 49506 Jõgeva County, Estonia. It is open from 9 am till 5 pm and closed on Saturday and Sunday.
3. Kohvik Õige Koht - A restaurant situated in Pihla tee 1, Kalmaküla, 42002 Ida-Viru maakond, Estonia. It opens only on Saturday and Sunday from 12 pm to 5 pm.
4. Kalaküla Kohvik-baar - A cafe in sooserva, Raja, 49509 Jõgeva maakond, Estonia. Dine-in and takeaway available but no delivery.
