= Lepiksaare =

Village in Estonia

Coordinates: 58°57′23″N 26°49′30″E

- Village
- Interactive map of Lepiksaare
- Country: Estonia
- County: Jõgeva County
- Parish: Mustvee Parish
- Time zone: UTC+2 (EET)
  - Summer (DST): UTC+3 (EEST)

Lepiksaare is a village in Mustvee Parish, Jõgeva County in northeastern Estonia.
