= Kõveriku =

Village in Estonia

Coordinates: 58°59′N 26°49′E

- Village
- Interactive map of Kõveriku
- Country: Estonia
- County: Jõgeva County
- Parish: Mustvee Parish
- Time zone: UTC+2 (EET)
  - Summer (DST): UTC+3 (EEST)

Kõveriku is a village in Mustvee Parish, Jõgeva County in northeastern Estonia.
