= Tammessaare =

Village in Estonia

Coordinates: 59°00′N 27°01′E

- Village
- Interactive map of Tammessaare
- Country: Estonia
- County: Jõgeva County
- Parish: Mustvee Parish
- Time zone: UTC+2 (EET)
  - Summer (DST): UTC+3 (EEST)

Tammessaare is a village in Mustvee Parish, Jõgeva County in northeastern Estonia.

From 1992 to 2017 (until the Estonian local government administrative reform), the village was located in Avinurme rural municipality, Ida-Viru county.

The Rehessaare stream runs through the village, and the neighboring villages have been Maetsma and Rehessaare villages.
