= Vadi, Estonia =

Village in Estonia

Coordinates: 59°00′N 26°58′E

Vadi
- Village
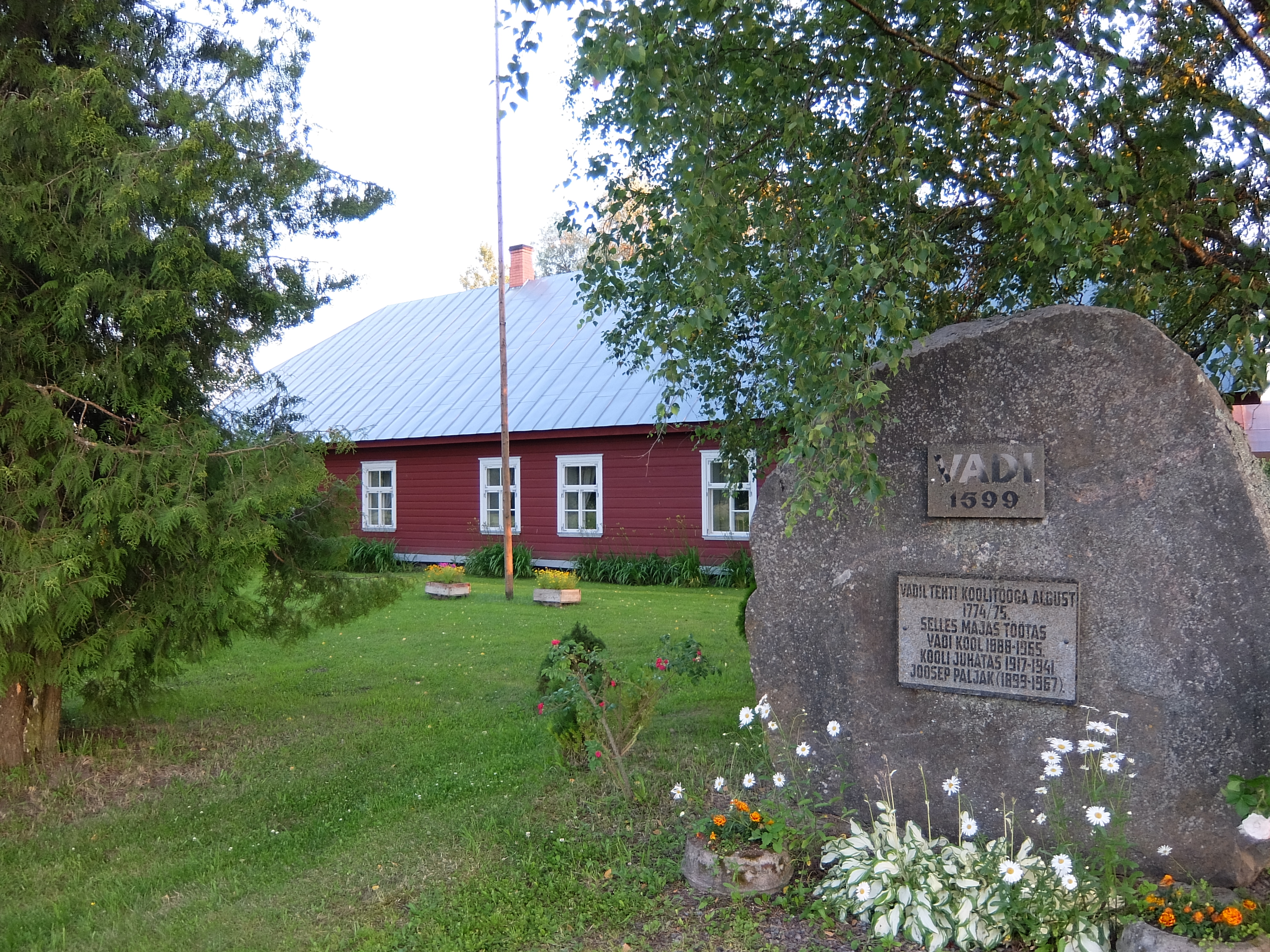
- Old Vadi schoolhouse
- Interactive map of Vadi
- Country: Estonia
- County: Jõgeva County
- Parish: Mustvee Parish
- Time zone: UTC+2 (EET)
  - Summer (DST): UTC+3 (EEST)

Vadi is a village in Mustvee Parish, Jõgeva County in northeastern Estonia.
