= Nõmme, Jõgeva County =

Village in Estonia

Coordinates: 58°47′10″N 26°55′11″E

Nõmme
- Village
- Interactive map of Nõmme
- Country: Estonia
- County: Jõgeva County
- Parish: Mustvee Parish
- Time zone: UTC+2 (EET)
  - Summer (DST): UTC+3 (EEST)

Nõmme is a village in Mustvee Parish, Jõgeva County in eastern Estonia.

== Name ==
Nõmme was attested in historical sources as Алексеевка, colloquially Лисеифка. According to traditional accounts, the village was founded in the first decade of the 20th century on plots of land divided from the forest to mark the birth of the heir to the throne, Alexei, hence the Russian name Aleksejevka (locally rendered as Lisseifka). From 1977 to 1998 the village was called Murru (< murd, genitive murru 'windbreak, meadow overgrown with brush'). The Estonian name Nõmme appears no later than in the 1922 census materials. The name comes from the common noun nõmm (genitive: nõmme) 'heath, moor, moorland', referring to the local geography.
