= Paadenurme =

Village in Estonia

Coordinates: 59°01′N 26°49′E

- Village
- Interactive map of Paadenurme
- Country: Estonia
- County: Jõgeva County
- Parish: Mustvee Parish
- Time zone: UTC+2 (EET)
  - Summer (DST): UTC+3 (EEST)

Paadenurme is a village in Mustvee Parish, Jõgeva County in northeastern Estonia.
