= Halliku =

Village in Estonia

- Village
- Location within Estonia
- Coordinates: 58°42′36″N 26°55′26″E
- Country: Estonia
- County: Jõgeva County
- Parish: Mustvee Parish

Population (2011)
  - Total: 56
- Time zone: UTC+2 (EET)
  - Summer (DST): UTC+3 (EEST)

Halliku (German: Hallick) is a village in Mustvee Parish, Jõgeva County in eastern Estonia.

== Census ==
As of 2011, the population of the village was 56.
