= Metsaküla, Jõgeva County =

Village in Estonia

Coordinates: 58°46′32″N 26°55′40″E

Metsaküla
- Village
- Interactive map of Metsaküla
- Country: Estonia
- County: Jõgeva County
- Parish: Mustvee Parish
- Time zone: UTC+2 (EET)
  - Summer (DST): UTC+3 (EEST)

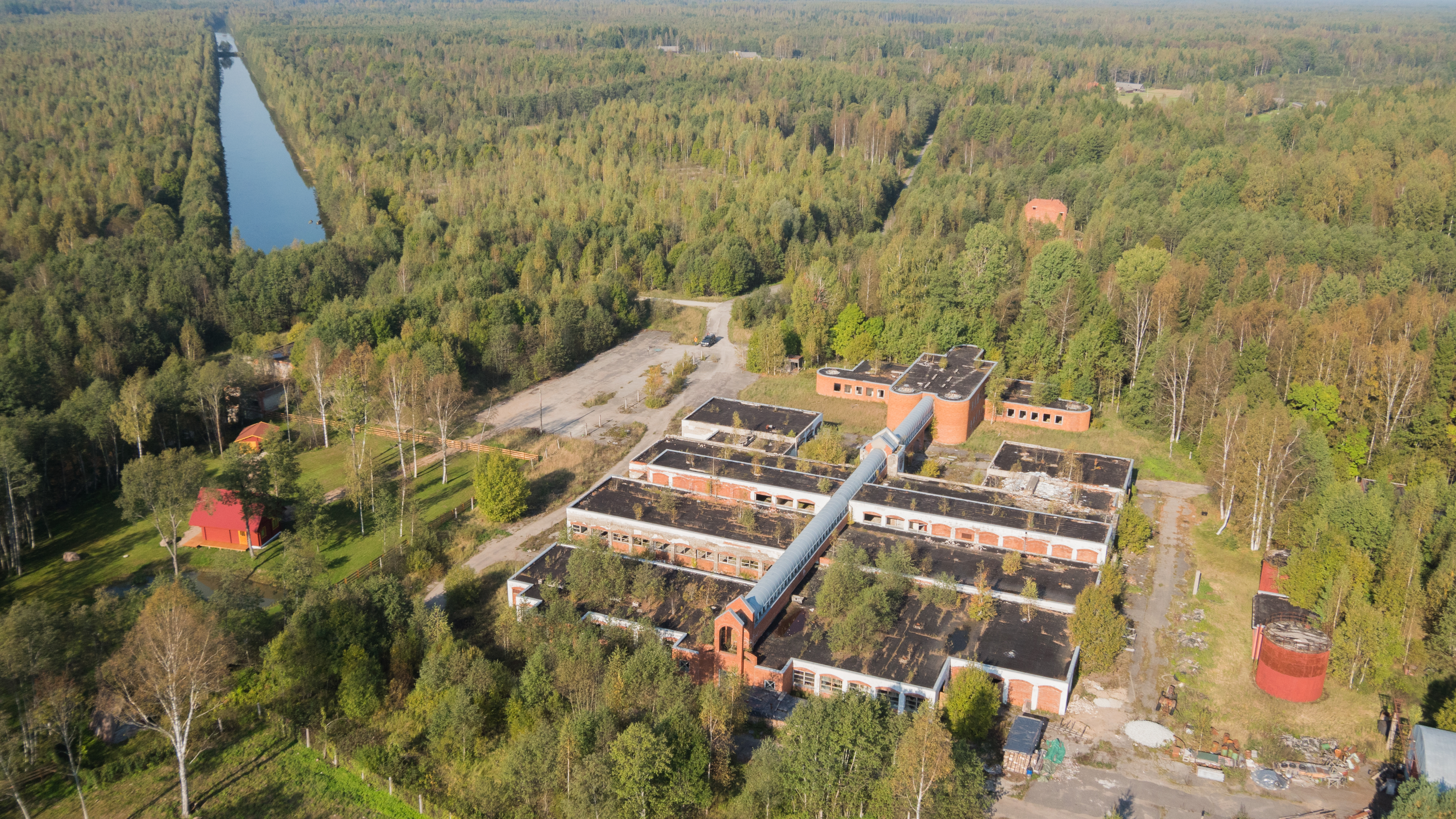
A fish farm in the southern part of the village.

Metsaküla is a village in Mustvee Parish, Jõgeva County in eastern Estonia.
