= Putu, Estonia =

Village in Estonia

Putu
- Village
- Location within Estonia
- Coordinates: 58°41′32″N 26°45′00″E
- Country: Estonia
- County: Jõgeva County
- Parish: Mustvee Parish

Population (2011)
  - Total: 37
- Time zone: UTC+2 (EET)
  - Summer (DST): UTC+3 (EEST)

Putu is a village in Mustvee Parish, Jõgeva County in eastern Estonia. As of 2011, the population of the village was 37.
