= Kükita =

Village in Estonia

Coordinates: 58°48′41″N 26°56′52″E

- Village
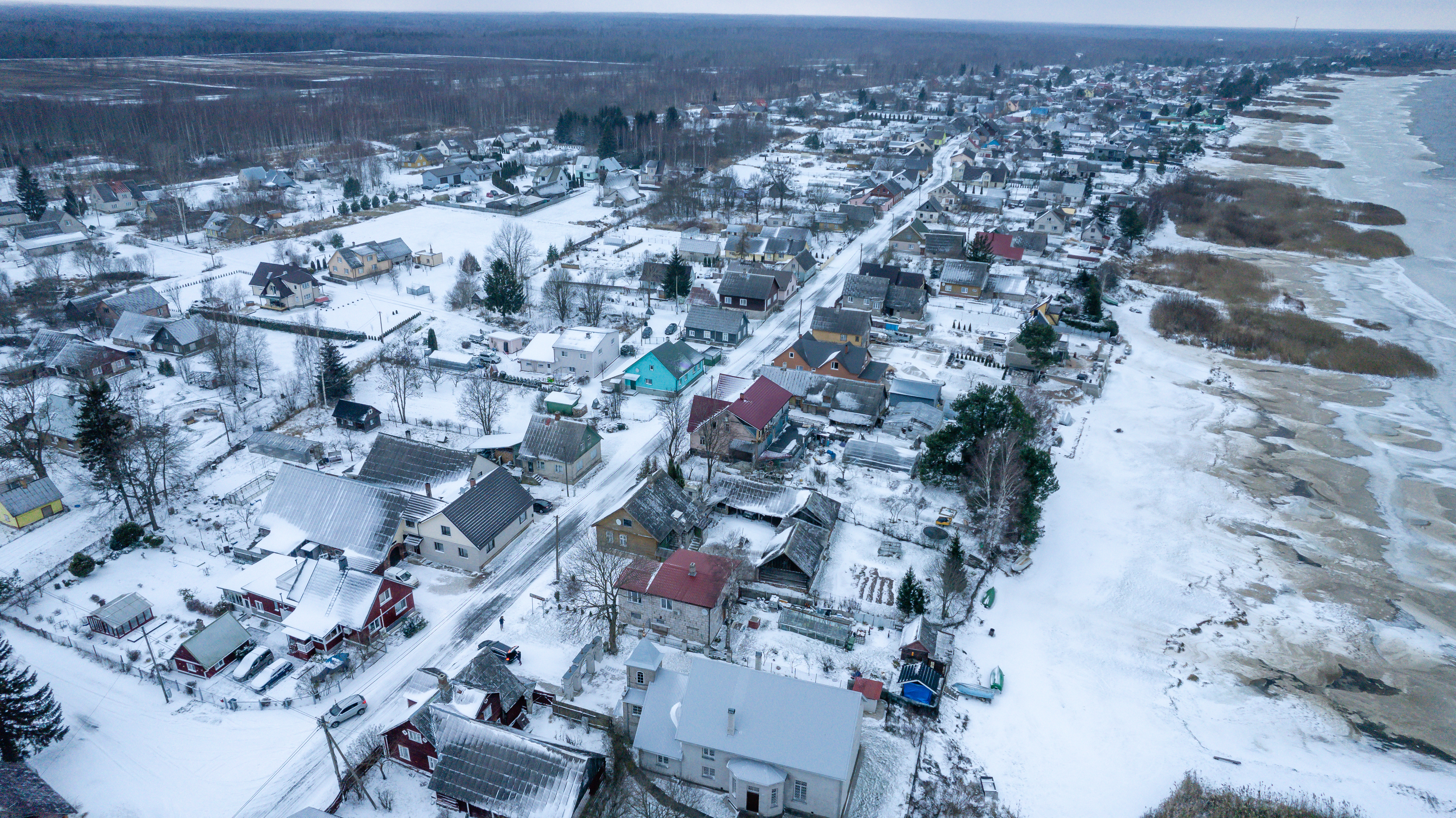
- Interactive map of Kükita
- Country: Estonia
- County: Jõgeva County
- Parish: Mustvee Parish
- Time zone: UTC+2 (EET)
  - Summer (DST): UTC+3 (EEST)

Kükita is a village in Mustvee Parish, Jõgeva County in eastern Estonia.
