= Kaasiku, Jõgeva County =

Village in Estonia

Coordinates: 58°46′32″N 26°58′31″E

Kaasiku
- Village
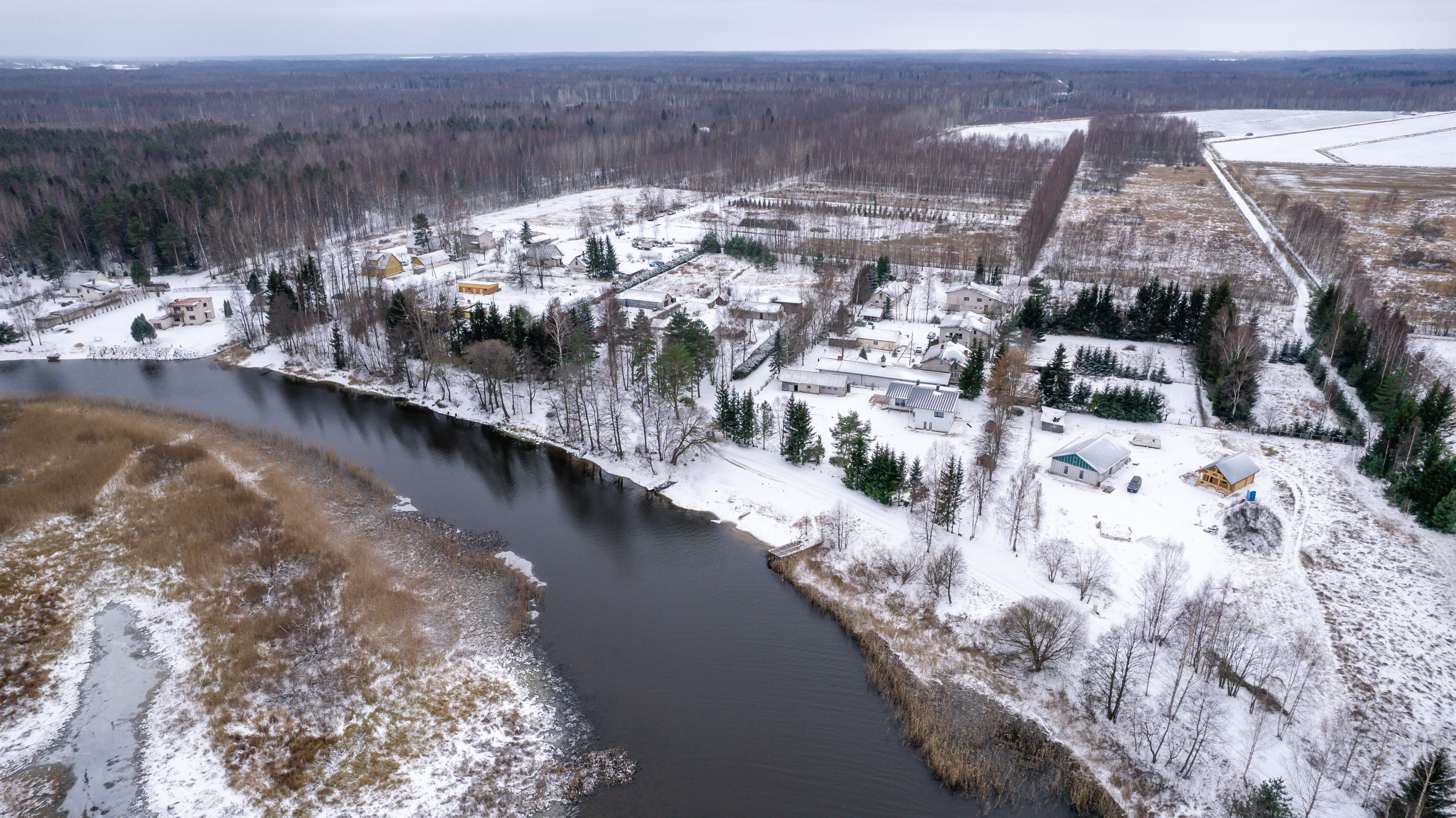
- Interactive map of Kaasiku
- Country: Estonia
- County: Jõgeva County
- Parish: Mustvee Parish
- Time zone: UTC+2 (EET)
  - Summer (DST): UTC+3 (EEST)

Kaasiku is a village in Mustvee Parish, Jõgeva County in eastern Estonia.
