= Adraku =

Village in Estonia

Coordinates: 58°56′N 26°49′E

- Village
- Interactive map of Adraku
- Country: Estonia
- County: Jõgeva County
- Parish: Mustvee Parish
- Time zone: UTC+2 (EET)
  - Summer (DST): UTC+3 (EEST)

Adraku is a village in Mustvee Parish, Jõgeva County in northeastern Estonia.
