= Pällu, Jõgeva County =

Village in Estonia

Pällu
- Village
- Location within Estonia
- Coordinates: 58°42′49″N 26°53′02″E
- Country: Estonia
- County: Jõgeva County
- Parish: Mustvee Parish

Population (2011)
  - Total: 53
- Time zone: UTC+2 (EET)
  - Summer (DST): UTC+3 (EEST)

Pällu is a village in Mustvee Parish, Jõgeva County in eastern Estonia. As of 2011, the population of the village was 53.
