= Vanassaare =

Village in Estonia

- Village
- Location within Estonia
- Coordinates: 58°39′59″N 26°47′30″E
- Country: Estonia
- County: Jõgeva County
- Parish: Mustvee Parish

Population (2011)
  - Total: 44
- Time zone: UTC+2 (EET)
  - Summer (DST): UTC+3 (EEST)

Vanassaare is a village in Mustvee Parish, Jõgeva County in eastern Estonia. As of 2011, the population of the village was 44.
