= Ulvi, Jõgeva County =

Village in Estonia

Coordinates: 58°54′24″N 26°48′27″E

Ulvi
- Village
- Interactive map of Ulvi
- Country: Estonia
- County: Jõgeva County
- Parish: Mustvee Parish
- Time zone: UTC+2 (EET)
  - Summer (DST): UTC+3 (EEST)

Ulvi is a village in Mustvee Parish, Jõgeva County in northeastern Estonia.
