= Kõrve, Jõgeva County =

Village in Estonia

Coordinates: 58°57′08″N 26°53′38″E

Kõrve
- Village
- Interactive map of Kõrve
- Country: Estonia
- County: Jõgeva County
- Parish: Mustvee Parish
- Time zone: UTC+2 (EET)
  - Summer (DST): UTC+3 (EEST)

Kõrve is a village in Mustvee Parish, Jõgeva County in northeastern Estonia.
