= Mustvee Parish =

Municipality of Estonia

Mustvee Parish Mustvee vald
- Municipality of Estonia
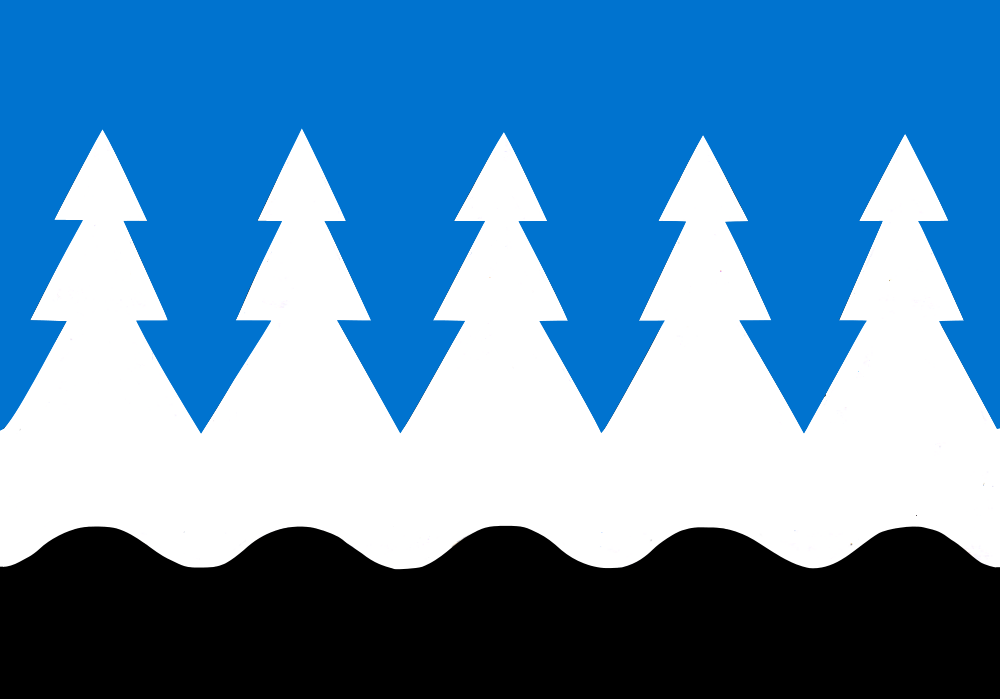
- Flag Coat of arms

- Mustvee Parish within Jõgeva County.
- Country: Estonia
- County: Jõgeva County
- Administrative centre: Mustvee

Area
  - Total: 615 km^{2} (237 sq mi)

Population
  - Total: 5,643
  - Density: 9.18/km^{2} (23.8/sq mi)
- ISO 3166 code: EE-486
- Website: https://mustveevald.kovtp.ee/

Mustvee Parish (Estonian: Mustvee vald) is a rural municipality within Jõgeva County, in Estonia. It includes the town of Mustvee.

== Settlements ==
Town

Mustvee

Boroughs

Avinurme, Lohusuu

Villages

There are 56 villages: Adraku, Alekere, Halliku, Jaama, Jõemetsa, Kaasiku, Kaevussaare, Kallivere, Kalmaküla, Kasepää, Kiisli, Kiissa, Koseveski, Kõrve, Kõrvemetsa, Kõveriku, Kärasi, Kääpa, Kükita, Laekannu, Lepiksaare, Levala, Maardla, Maetsma, Metsaküla, Nautrasi, Ninasi, Nõmme, Odivere, Omedu, Paadenurme, Pedassaare, Piilsi, Putu, Pällu, Raadna, Raja, Ruskavere, Saarjärve, Separa, Sirguvere, Sälliksaare, Tammessaare, Tammispää, Tarakvere, Tiheda, Tuulavere, Ulvi, Vadi, Vanassaare, Vassevere, Veia, Vilusi, Voore, Võtikvere, Änniksaare.

== Religion ==
Religion in Mustvee Parish (2021)
1. Unaffiliated (62.9%)
2. Orthodox & Old Believers (23.3%)
3. Lutheran (11.3%)
4. Baptism (0.40%)
5. Others Religions (2.10%)
6. 0.00%

== Notable people ==
- Otto Wilhelm Masing (1763 in Lohusuu – 1832), a clergyman, writer, journalist, linguist, early Estophile
- Heino Kiik (1927 in Avinurme – 2013), writer and journalist.
- Leonhard Merzin (1934 in Maardla – 1990), theatre and film actor
- Mati Unt (1944 in Voore – 2005), writer, essayist and theatre director.
- Kätlin Kaldmaa (born 1970 in Voore), freelance writer, poet, translator and literary critic.
- Dagmar Oja (born 1981 in Avinurme), singer
