= Jõgeva County =

County of Estonia

Coordinates: 58°42′N 26°24′E

Jõgeva County Jõgevamaa
- County
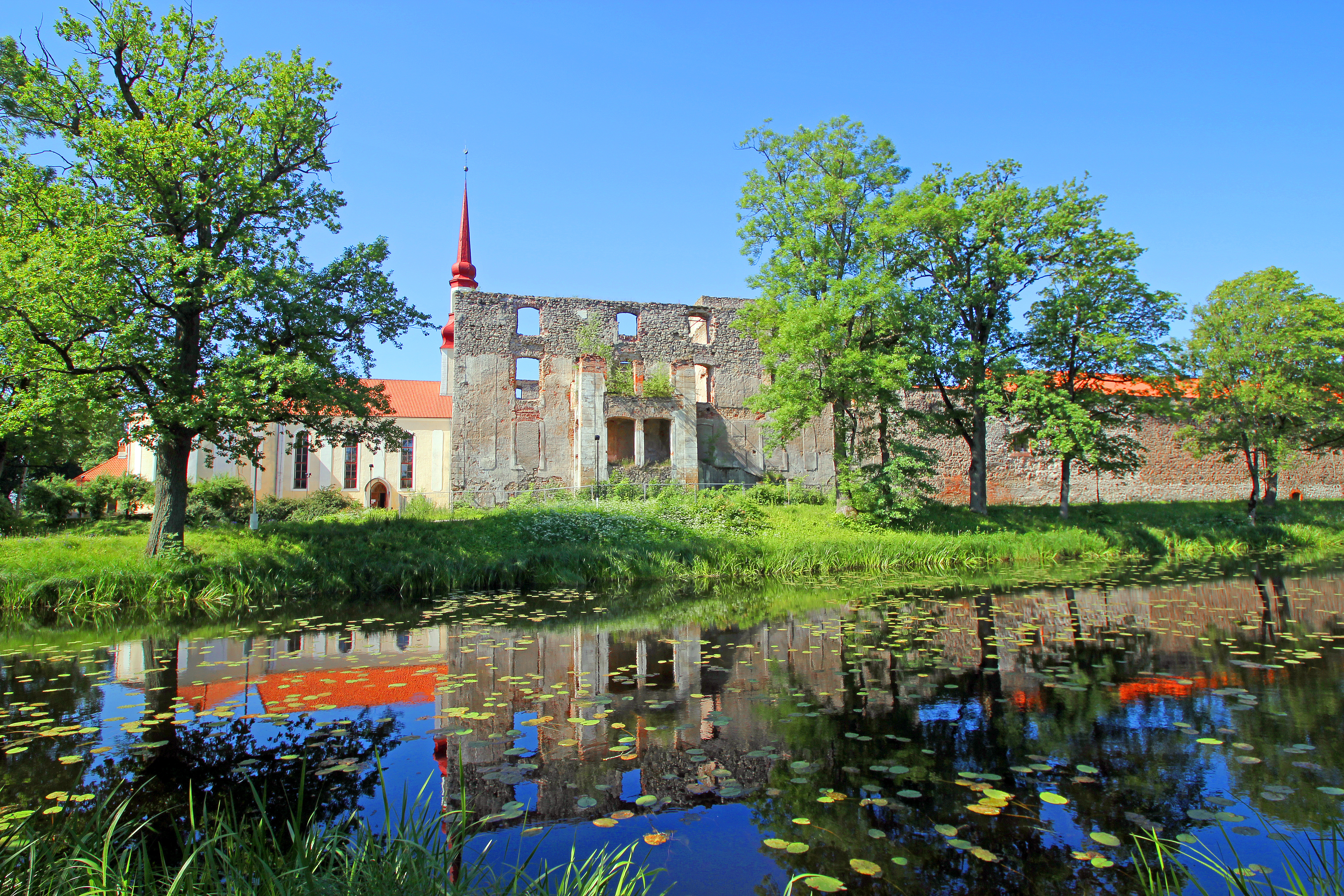
- Põltsamaa Castle

- Flag Coat of arms

- Country: Estonia
- Capital: Jõgeva

Area
  - Total: 2,603.83 km^{2} (1,005.34 sq mi)

Population (2022)
  - Total: 27,857
  - Rank: 10th
  - Density: 10.698/km^{2} (27.709/sq mi)

Ethnicity
  - Estonians: 91.4%
  - Russians: 6.7%
  - other: 1.9%

GDP
  - Total: €466 million (2022)
  - Per capita: €16,768 (2022)
- ISO 3166 code: EE-50
- Vehicle registration: J

Jõgeva County (Estonian: Jõgeva maakond or Jõgevamaa) is one of 15 counties of Estonia. It is located in the eastern part of the country, and it borders Ida-Viru County to the northeast, Lake Peipus to the east, Tartu County to the south, Viljandi County to the southwest, Järva County to the northwest, and Lääne-Viru County to the north.

== History ==
Jõgeva County was created January 1, 1990, from parts of Viljandi and Tartu counties.

=== County government ===
Previously the county government (Estonian: Maavalitsus) was led by a governor (Estonian: maavanem), who was appointed by the Government of Estonia for a term of five years. Since 2009 until 2017, the Jõgeva County governor position was held by Viktor Svjatõšev. From January 1, 2018, county governments were shut down in Estonia.

== Municipalities ==
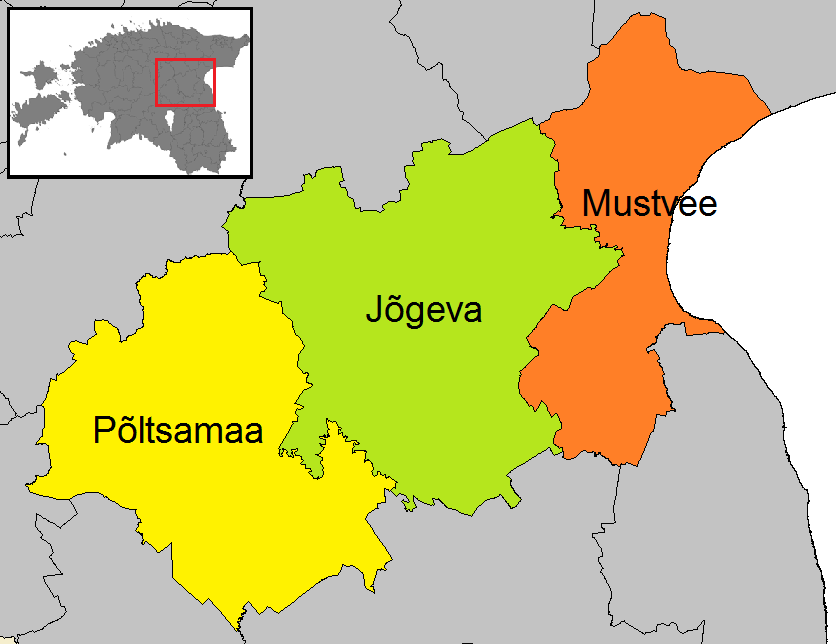
Municipalities since 2017.

The county is subdivided into municipalities. There are three rural municipalities (Estonian: vallad 'parishes') in Jõgeva County.

Rank	Municipality	Type	Population (2018)	Area km^{2}	Density
1	Jõgeva Parish	Rural	13,889	1,038	13.4
2	Mustvee Parish	Rural	5,643	615	9.2
3	Põltsamaa Parish	Rural	10,012	891	11.2

== Religion ==
The following congregations of the Estonian Evangelical Lutheran Church (EELC) operate in Jõgeva County: Jõgeva, Kursi, Laiuse, Lohusuu, Avinurme, Maarja-Magdaleena, Mustvee, Palamuse and Torma congregation under EELC's Tartu Deanery and Põltsamaa congregation under EELC's Viljandi Deanery.

Regarding Eastern Orthodoxy, there are under the Estonian Apostolic Orthodox Church congregations in Põltsamaa and Kaarepere. An Orthodox congregation in Mustvee operates under the jurisdiction of the Estonian Orthodox Church of the Moscow Patriarchate The congregation of Mercy and the Holy Trinity, which operates in Mustvee, is an independent Orthodox congregation that does not belong to the canonical jurisdiction of either the Estonian Apostolic Orthodox Church or the Moscow Patriarchate. Old Believer congregations operate in Mustvee, Raja and Kükita.

There are three Baptist congregations in the county, and Adventists and other Christians also have their congregations.

Religious affiliations in Jõgeva County, census 2000–2021*
Religion	2000		2011		2021	
Religion	Number	%	Number	%	Number	%
Christianity	7,815	25.8	5,504	20.5	4,640	19.3
—Orthodox Christians	954	3.2	1,081	4.0	1,160	4.8
—Lutherans	5,982	19.7	3,686	13.8	2,690	11,2
—Catholics	37	0.1	34	0.1	140	0.5
—Baptists	58	0.2	59	0.2	80	0.3
—Jehovah's Witnesses	95	0.3	110	0.4	100	0.4
—Pentecostals	14	0.04	29	0.1	30	0.1
—Old Believers	600	2.0	404	1.5	360	1.5
—Methodists	11	0.04	7	0.02	-	-
—Adventists	64	0.3	57	0.2	40	0.1
—Other Christians	-	-	37	0.1	40	0.1
Islam	7	0.02	8	0.02	-	
Buddhism	-	-	16	0.05	10	0.04
Other religions**	106	0.3	186	0.7	260	1.0
No religion	12,838	42.4	17,505	65.5	16,370	68.3
Not stated***	9,514	31.4	3,497	13.1	2,630	11.0
Total population*	30,280		26,721		23,940	
*The censuses of Estonia count the religious affiliations of the population older than 15 years of age. ".

== See also ==
- Vooremaa
- Vooremaa (newspaper)

== Images ==
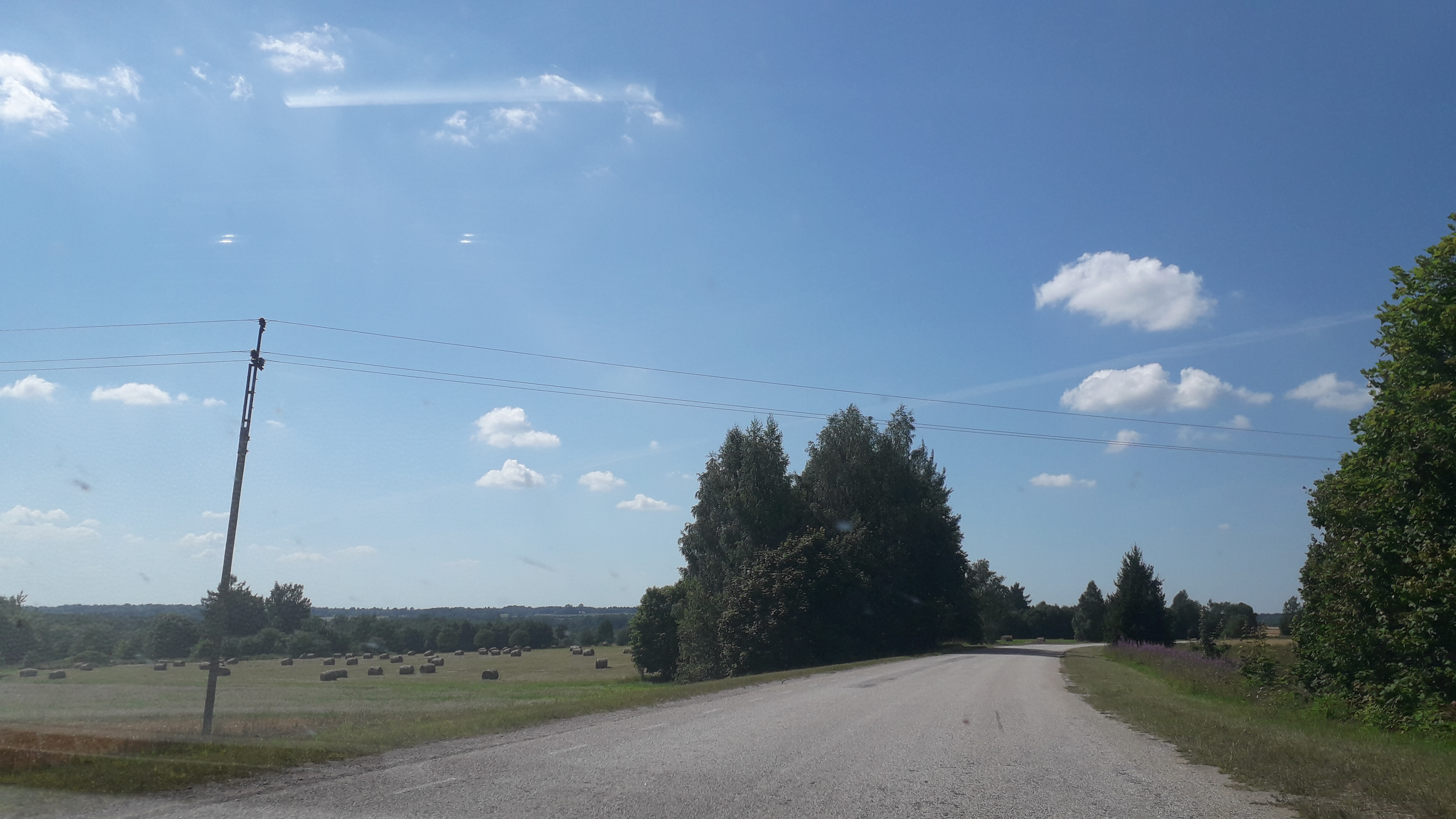
Central Jõgeva parish

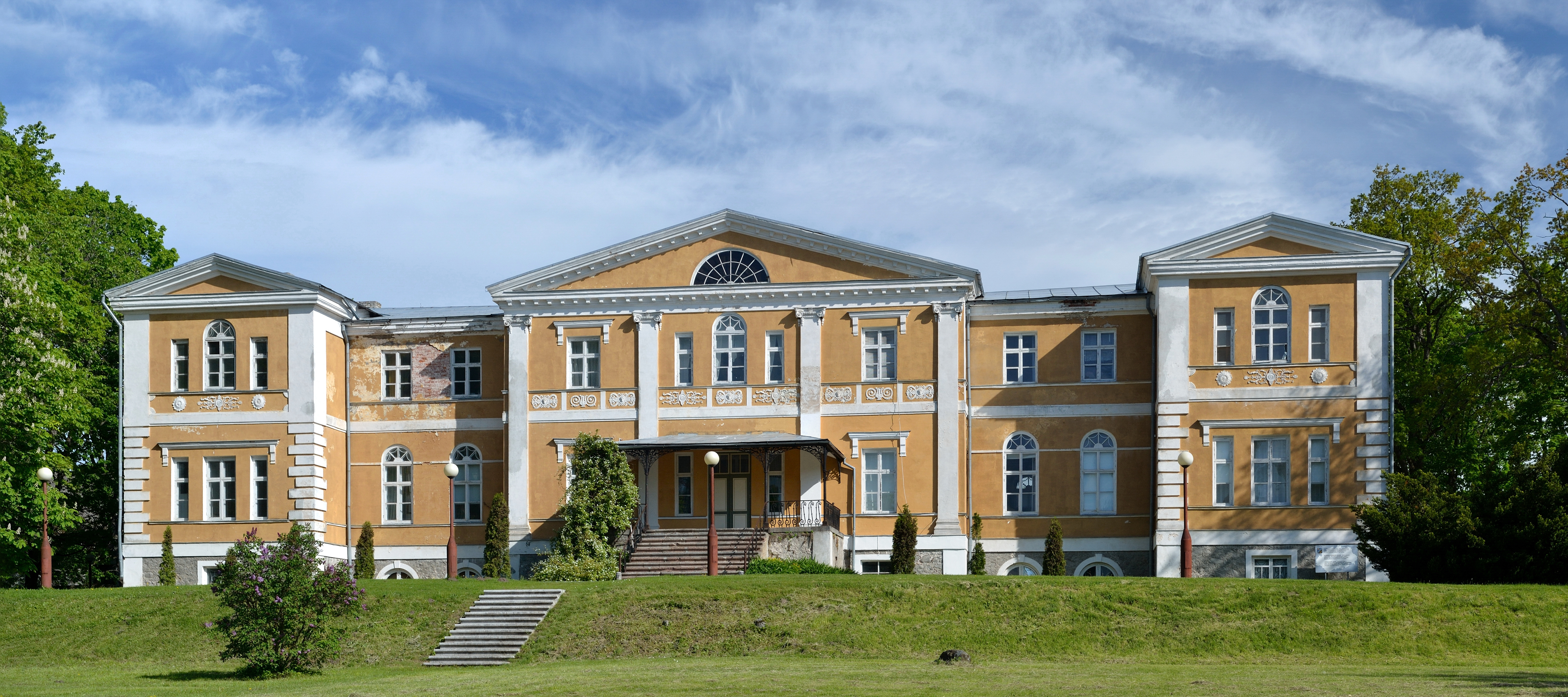
Main building of Kuremaa manor

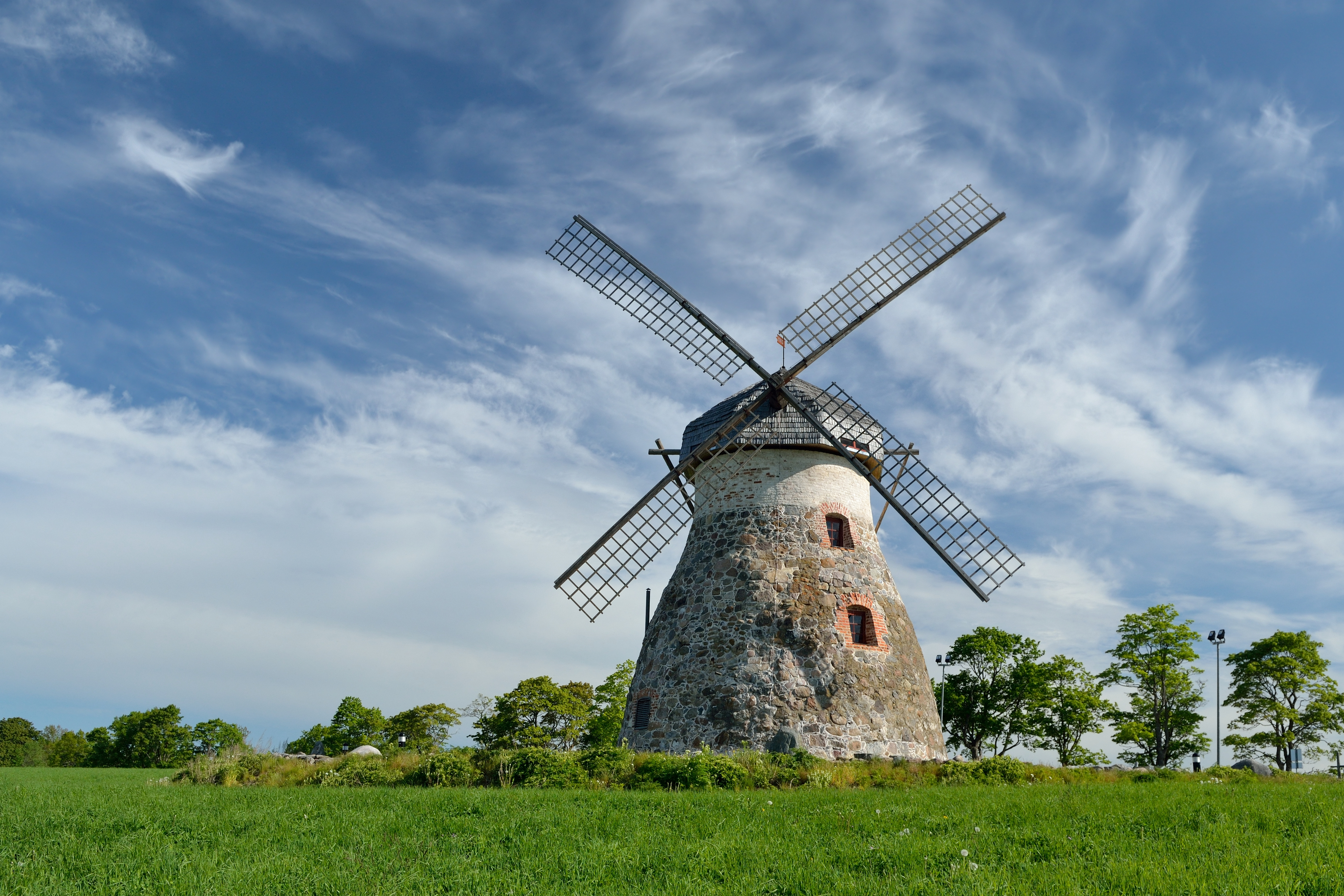
Kuremaa windmill

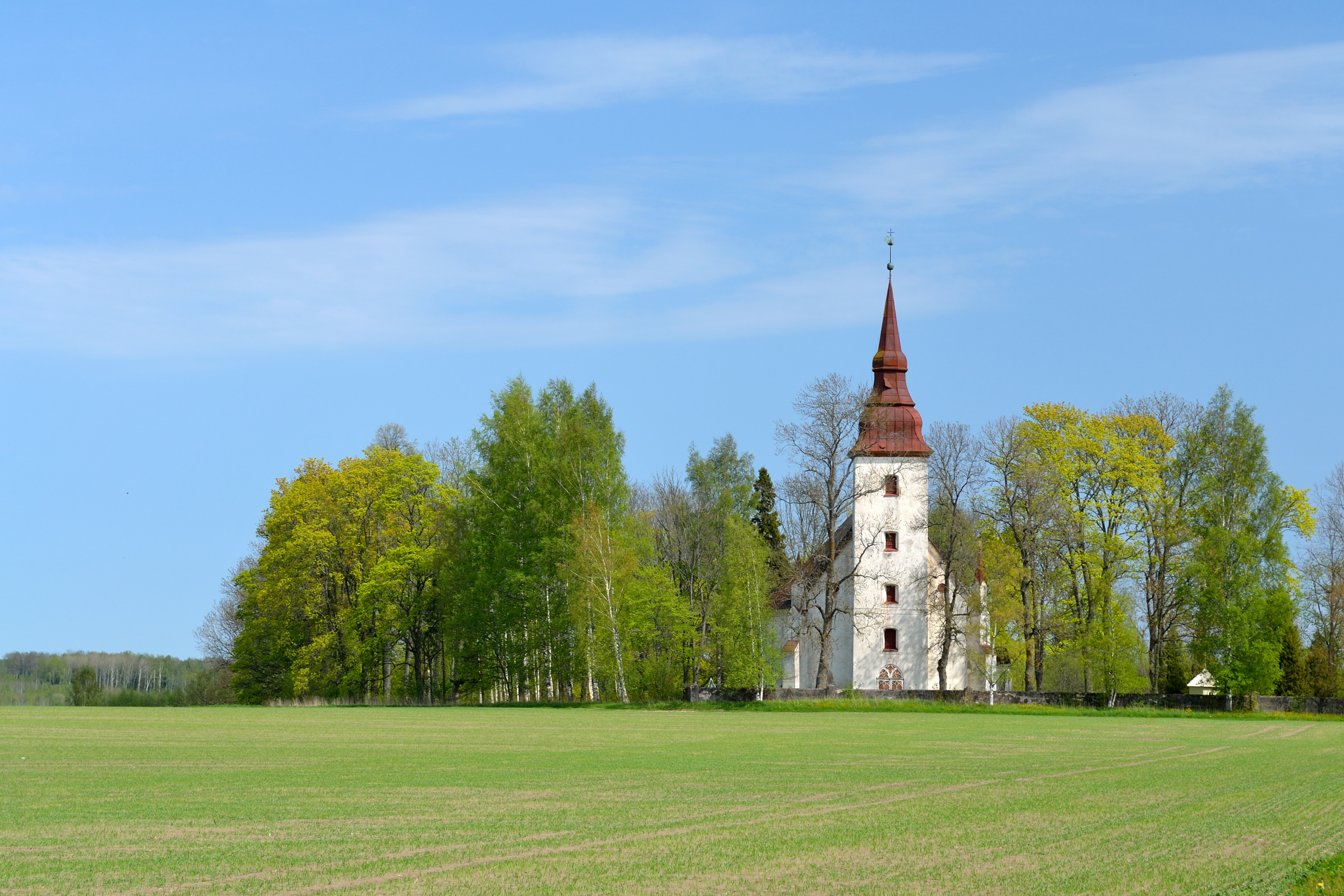
Torma Church

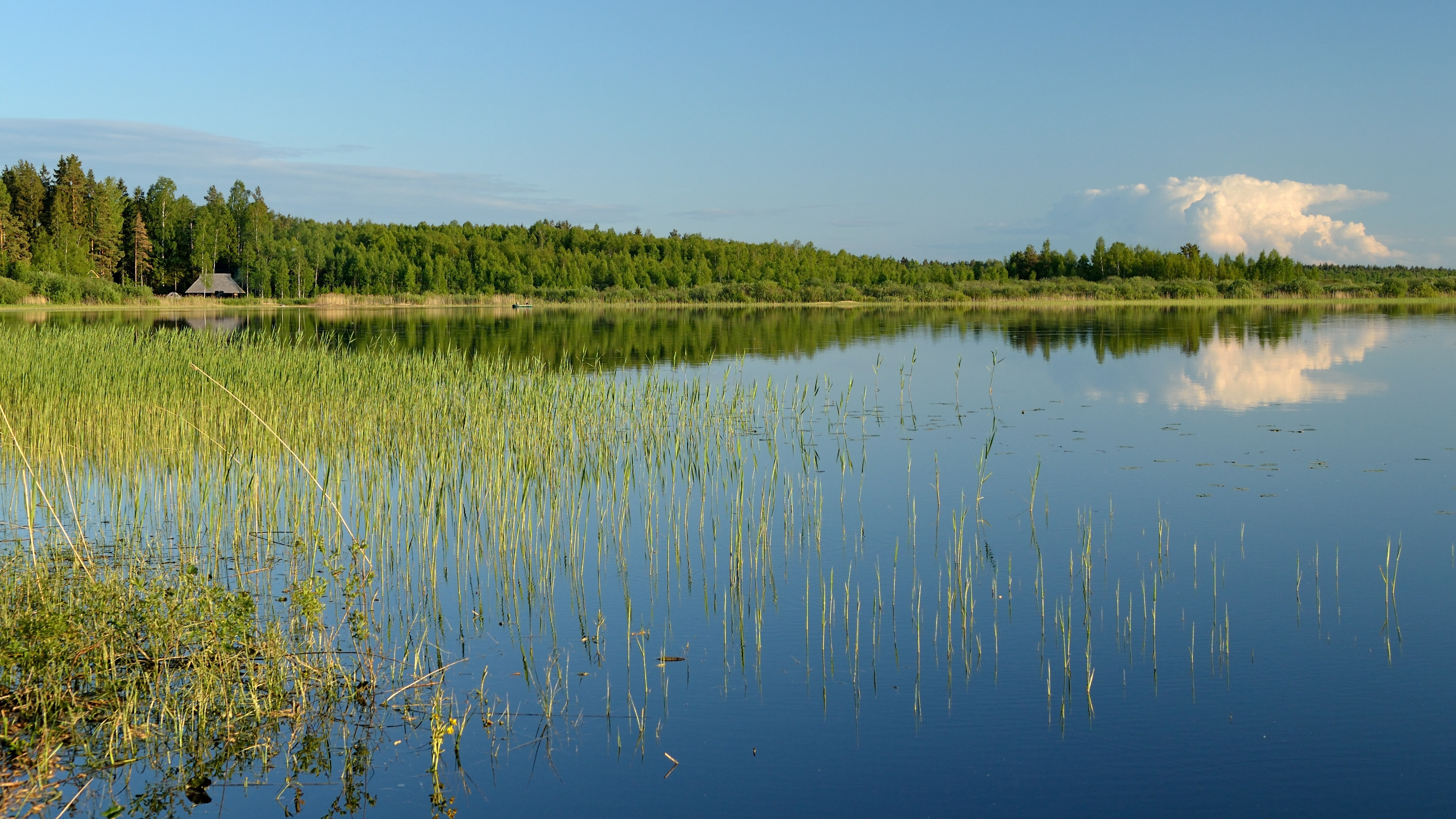
Kaiu Lake

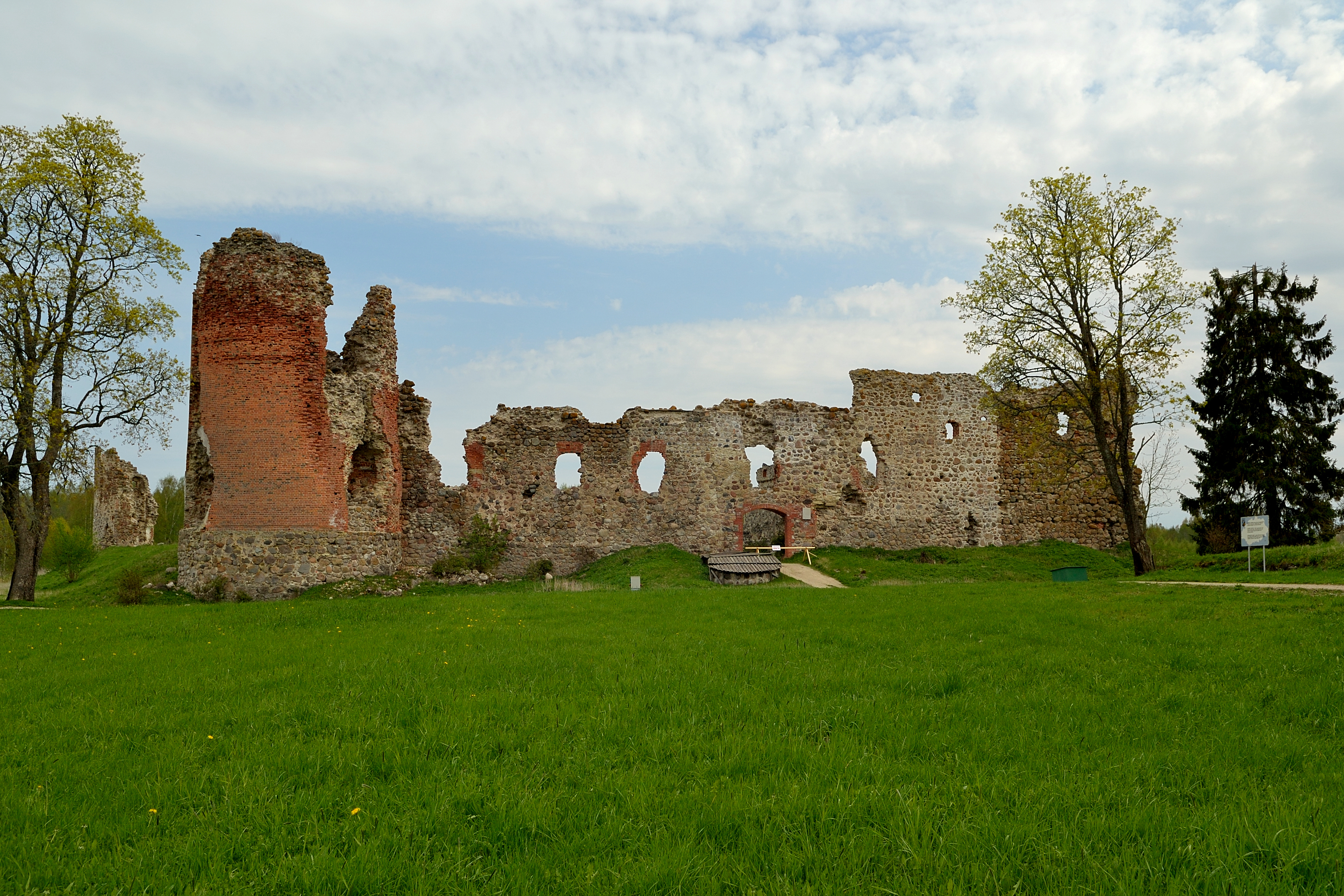
Laiuse Castle ruins

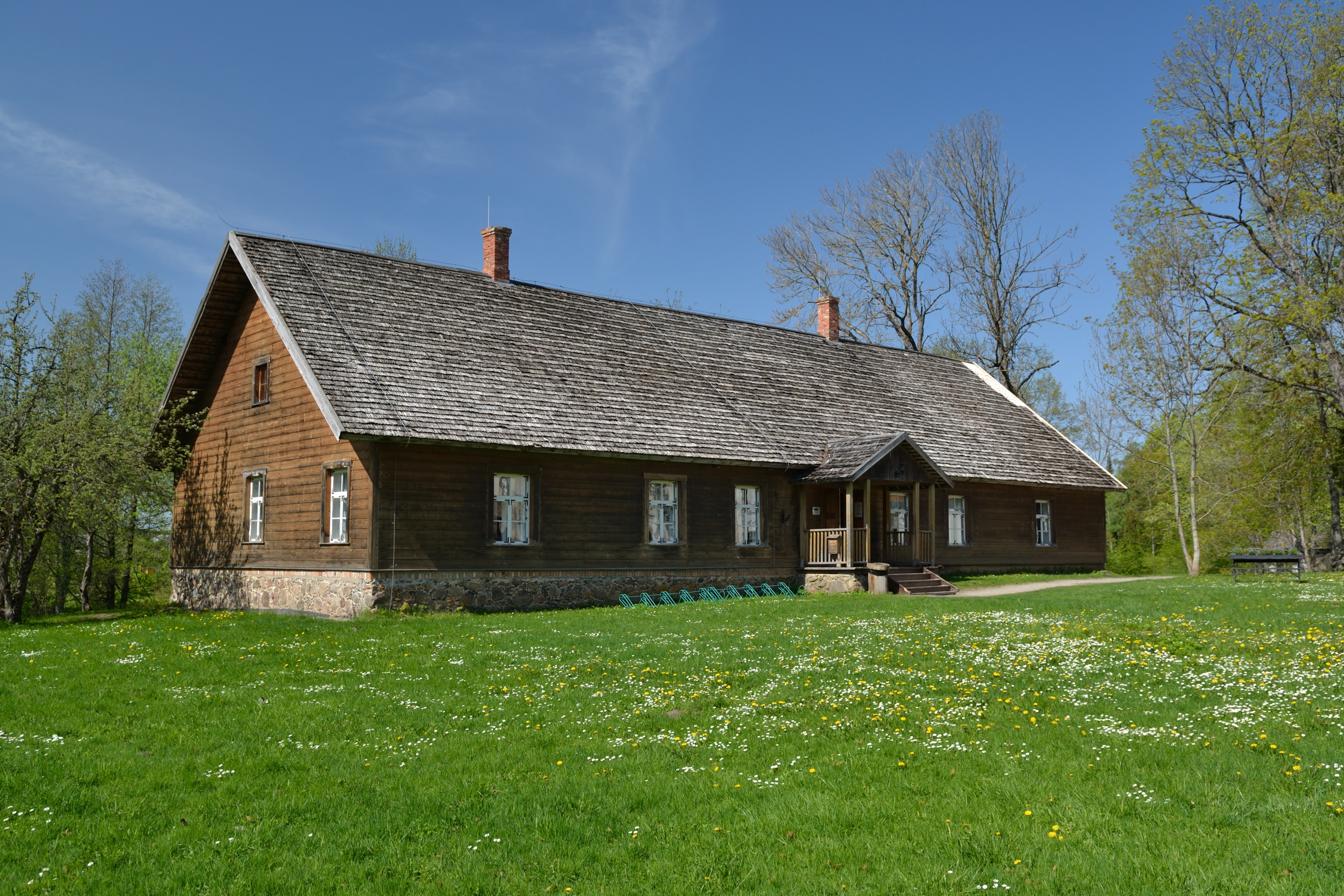
Palamuse parish school

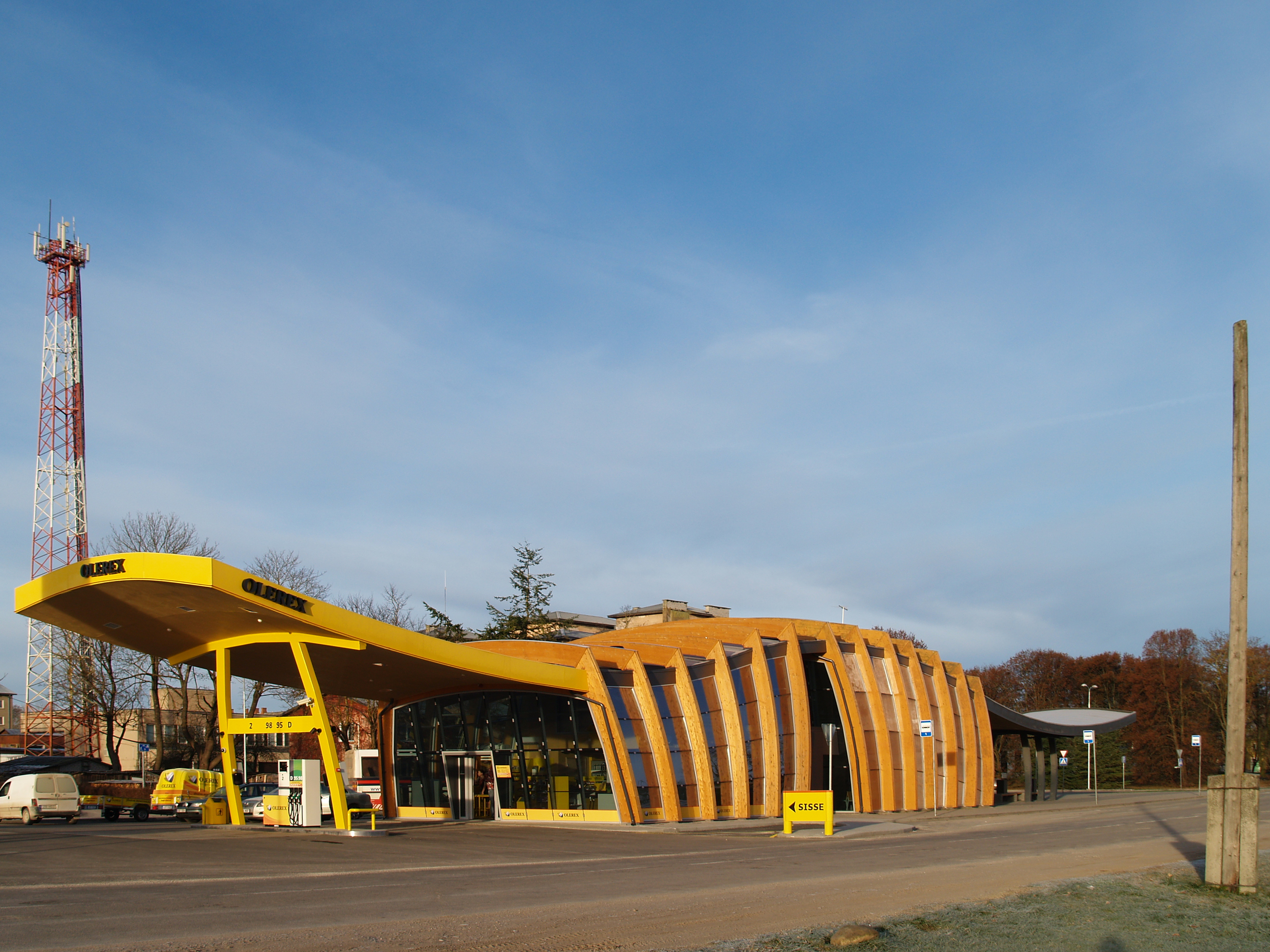
Jõgeva bus station

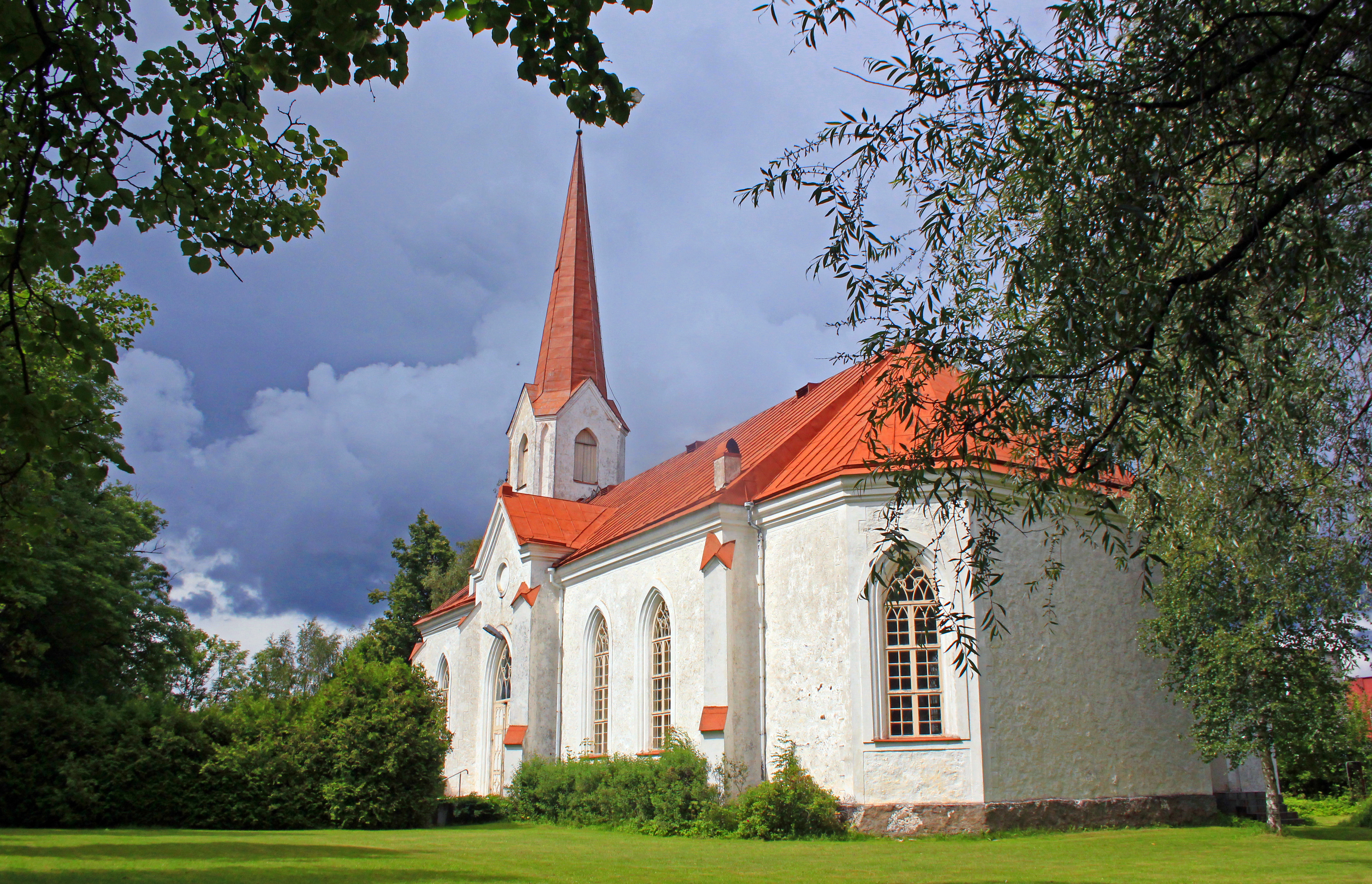
Mustvee Church

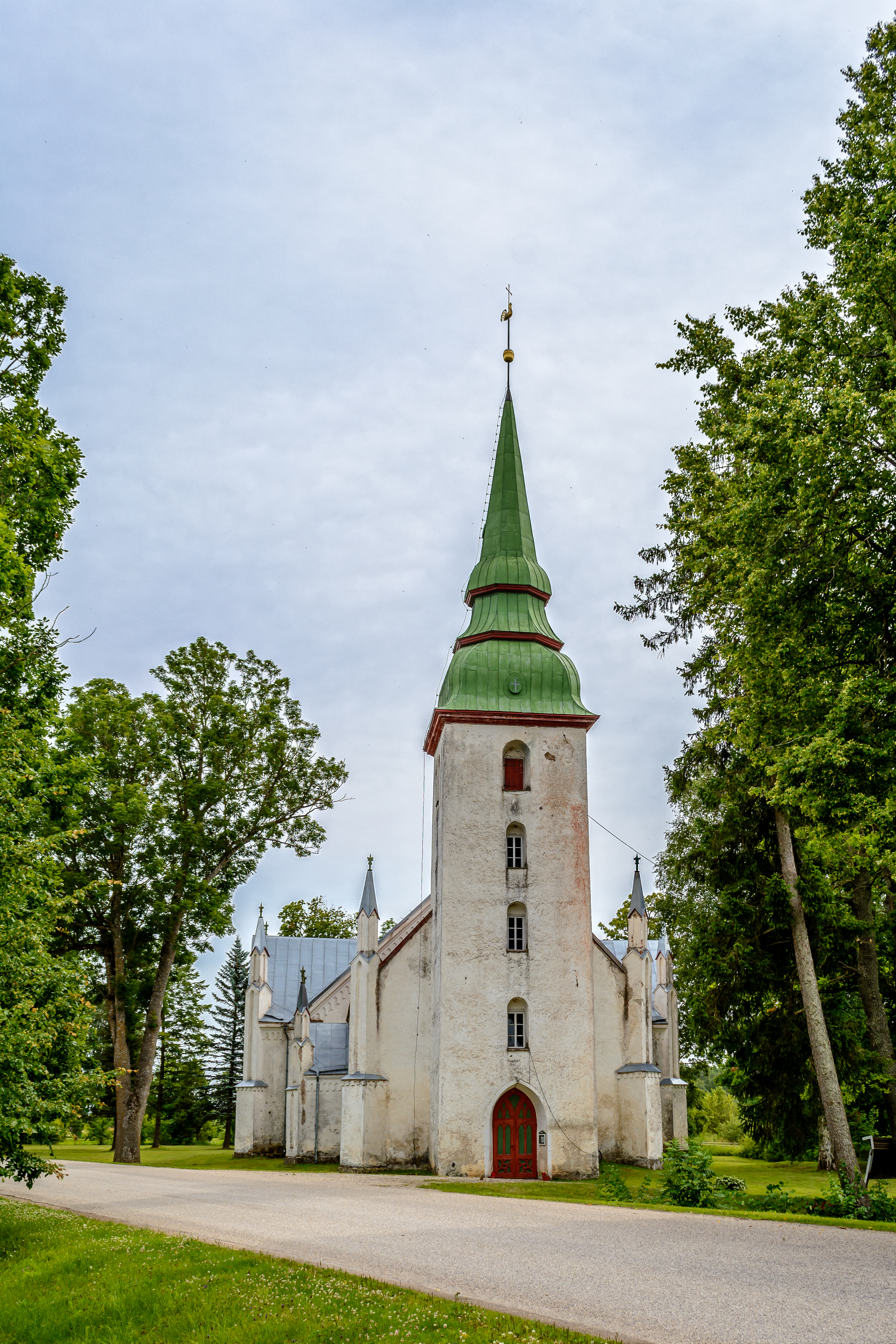
Kursi Church

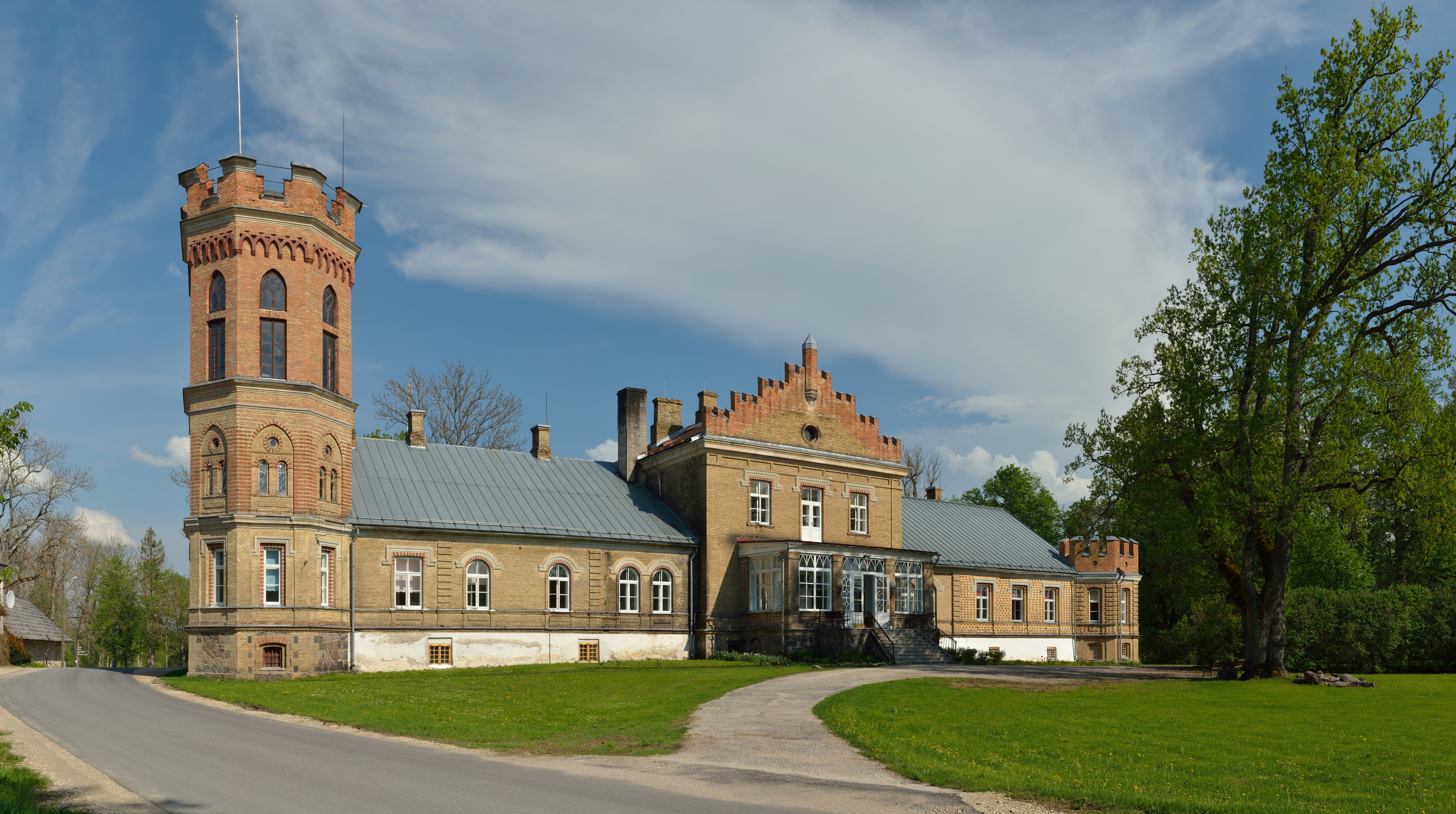
Main building of Lustivere manor

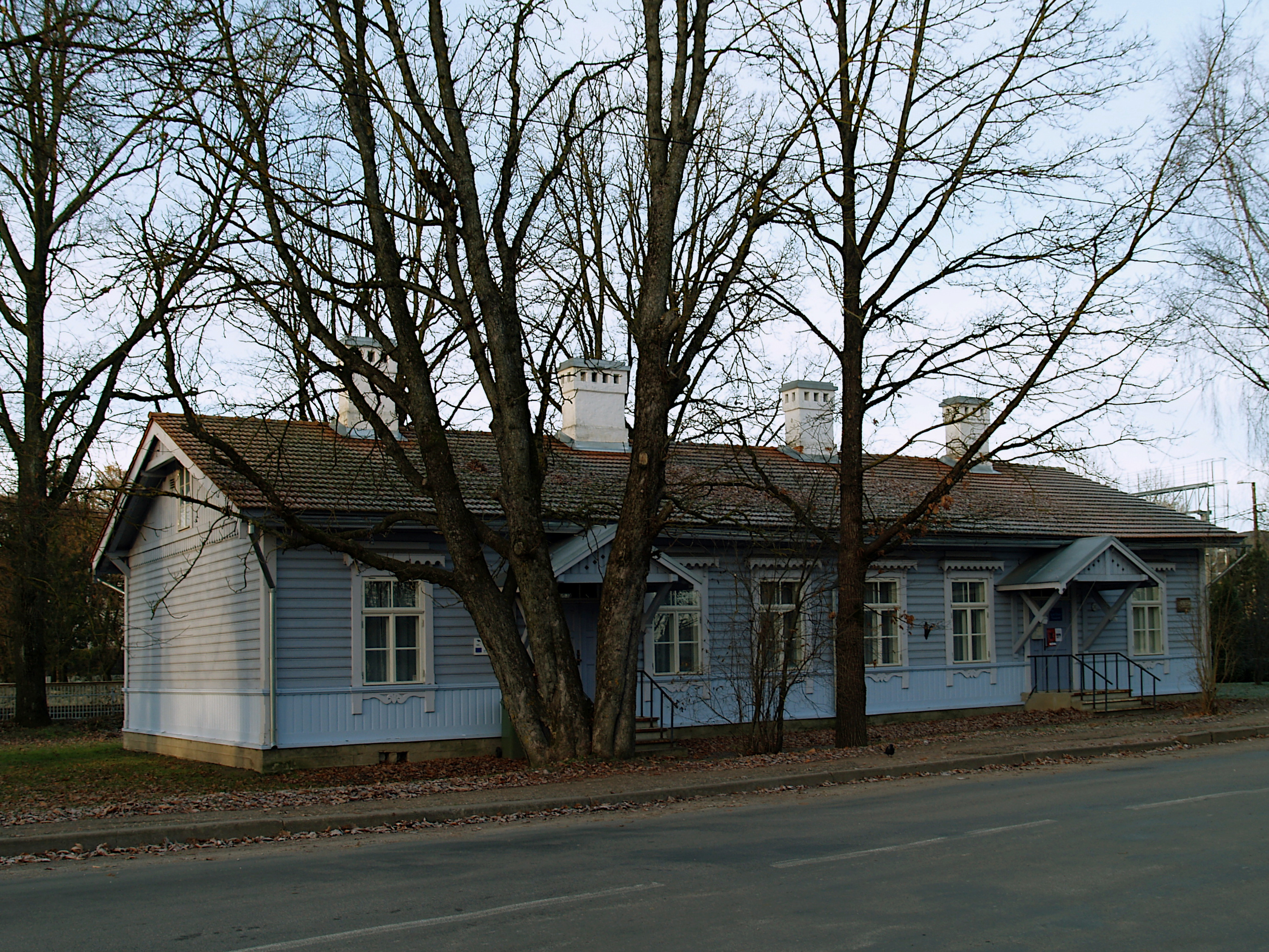
Betti Alver museum in Jõgeva

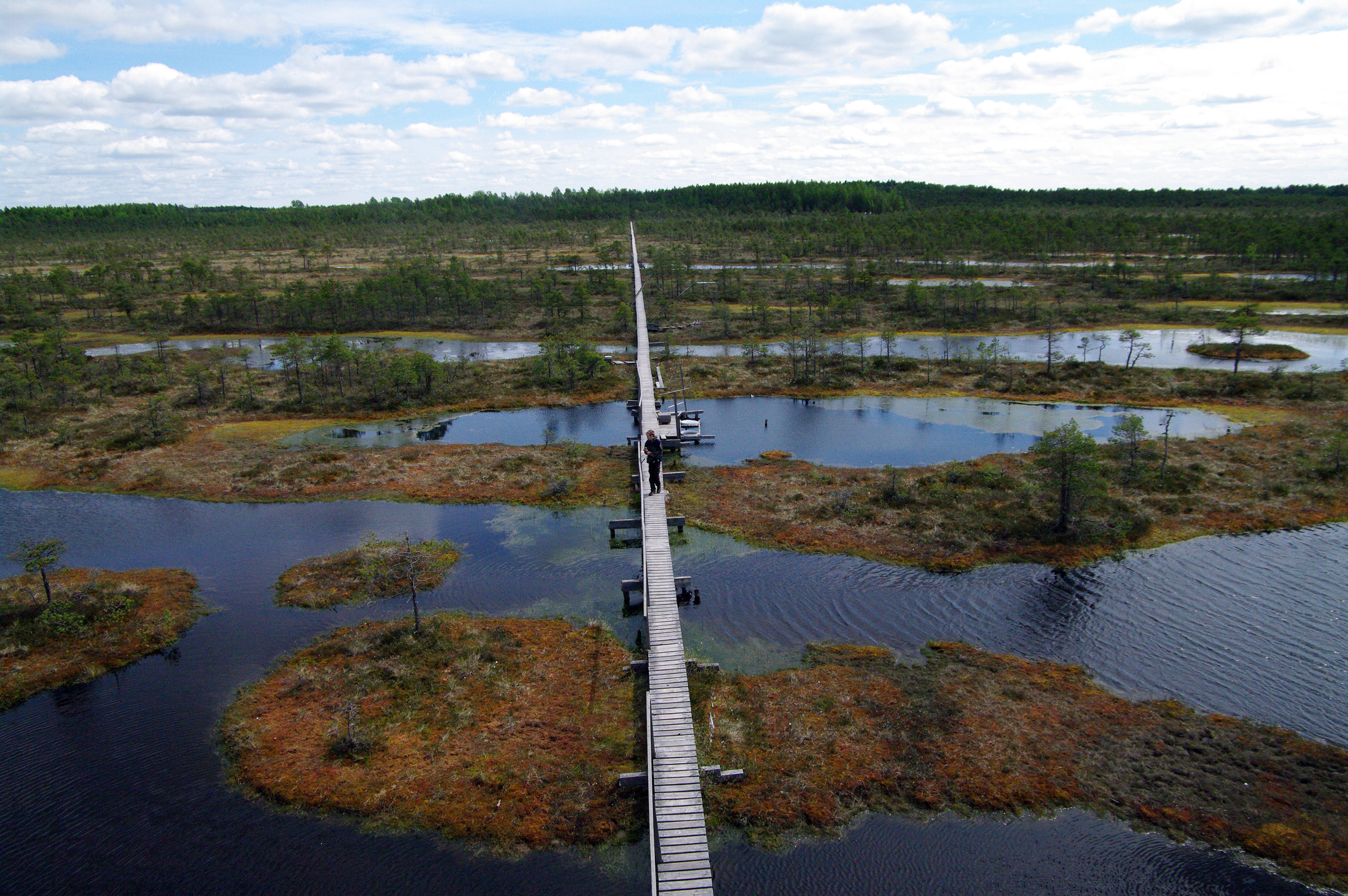
Männikjärve bog in Endla

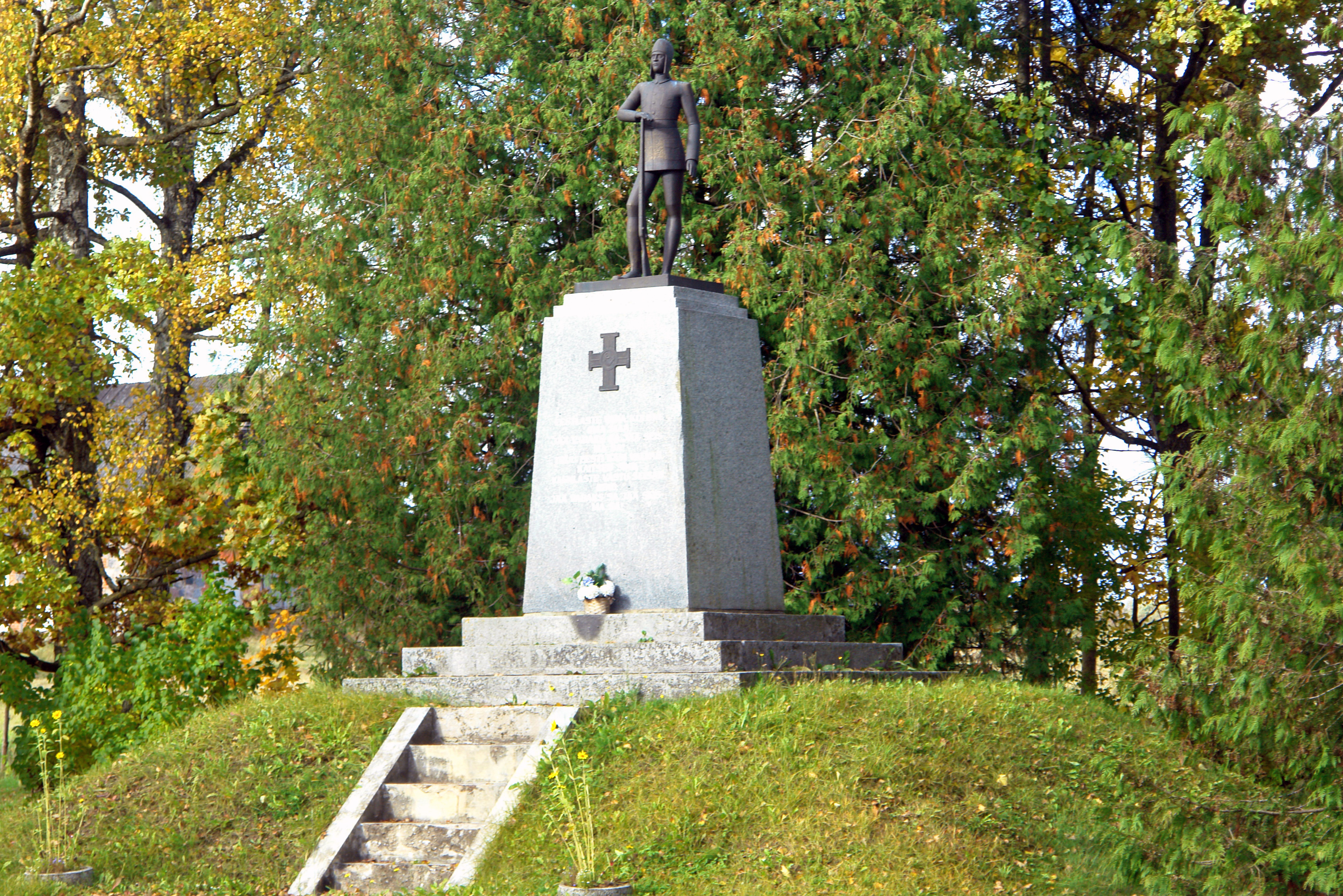
Estonian War of Independence Memorial in Kursi

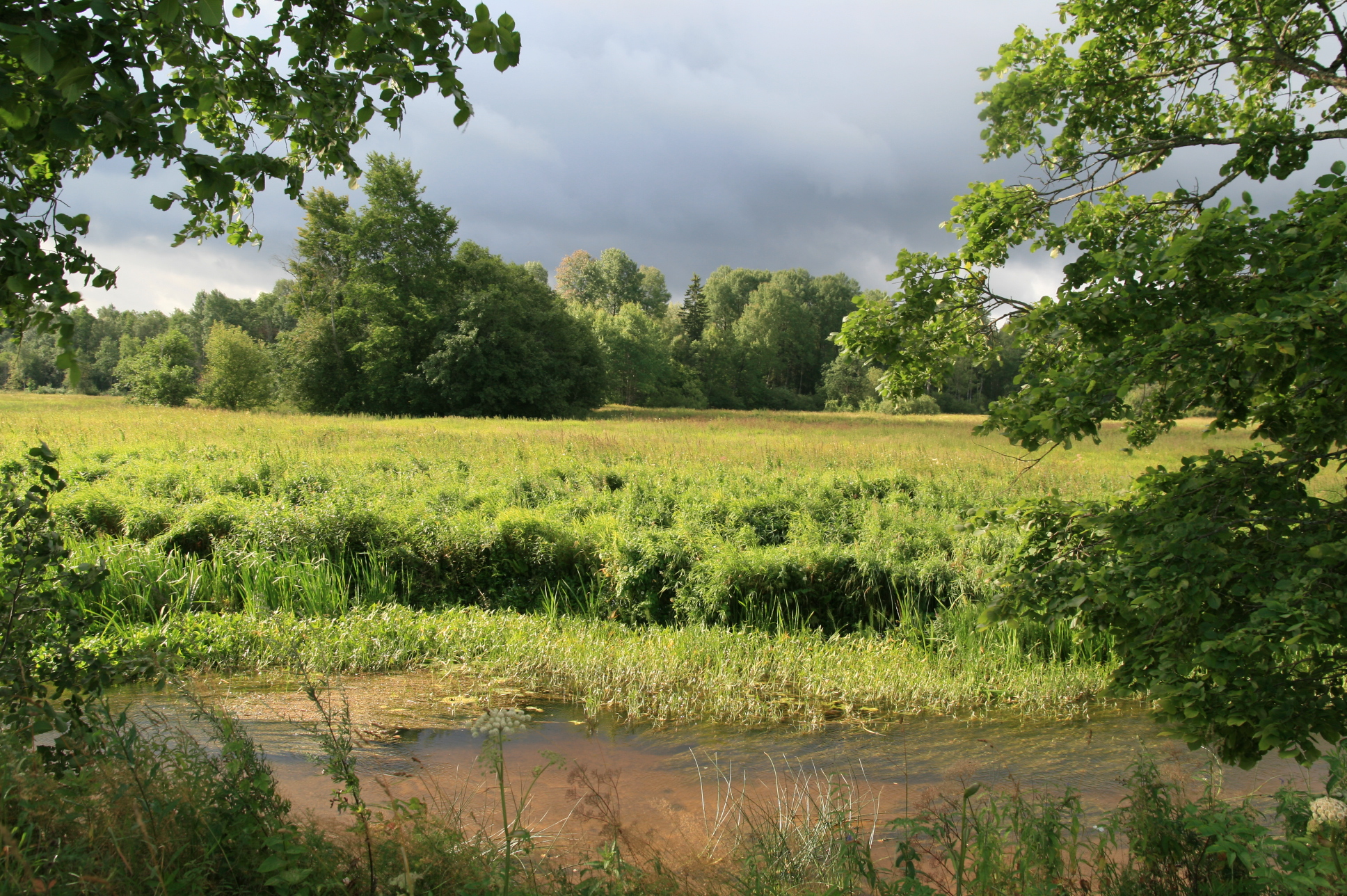
Floodplain of the Pedja River in Alam-Pedja Nature Reserve near Kirna

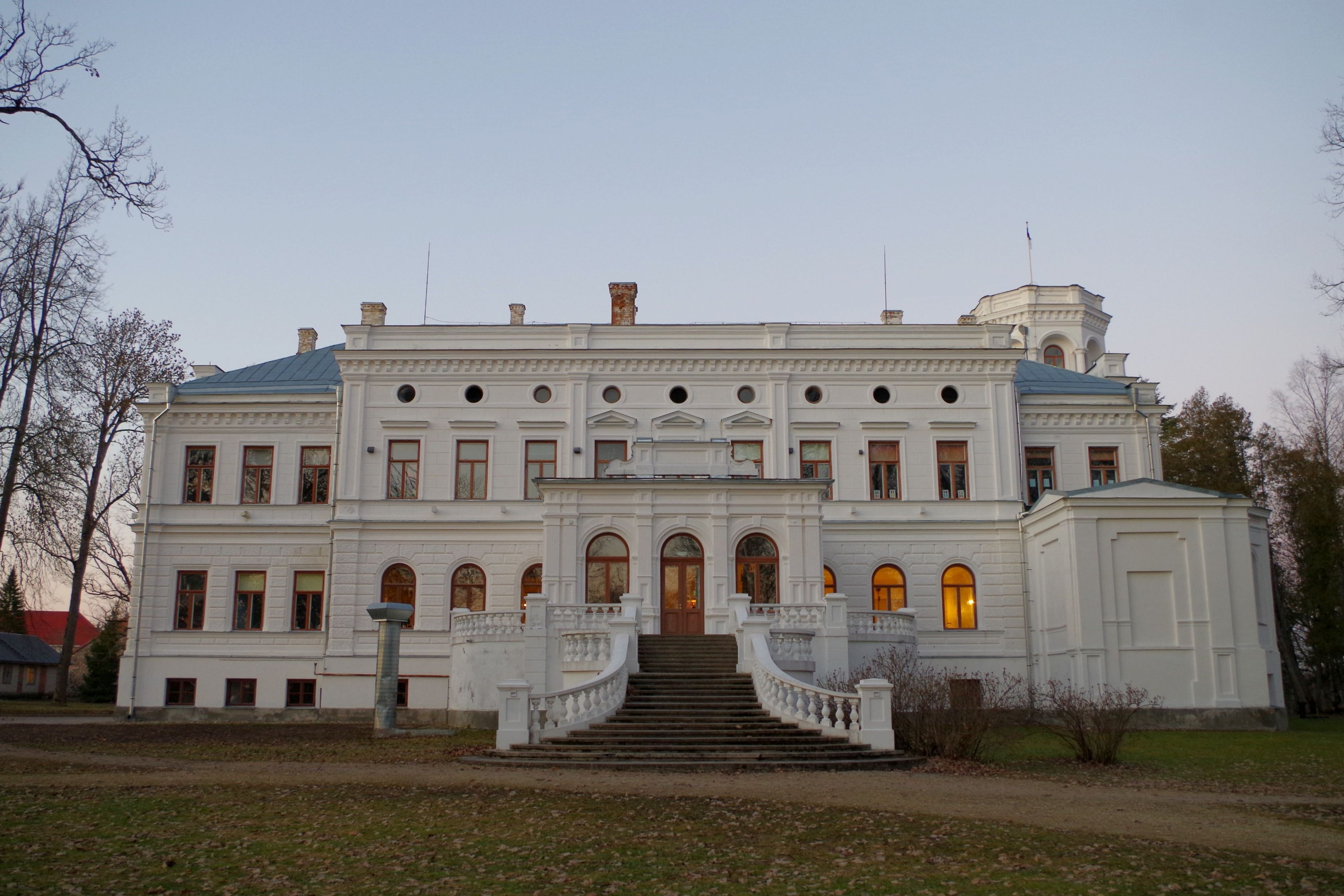
Main building of Puurmani manor
