= Puurmani Parish =

Former municipality of Estonia

Coordinates: 58°34′41″N 26°16′31″E

Puurmani Parish Puurmani vald
- Former municipality of Estonia
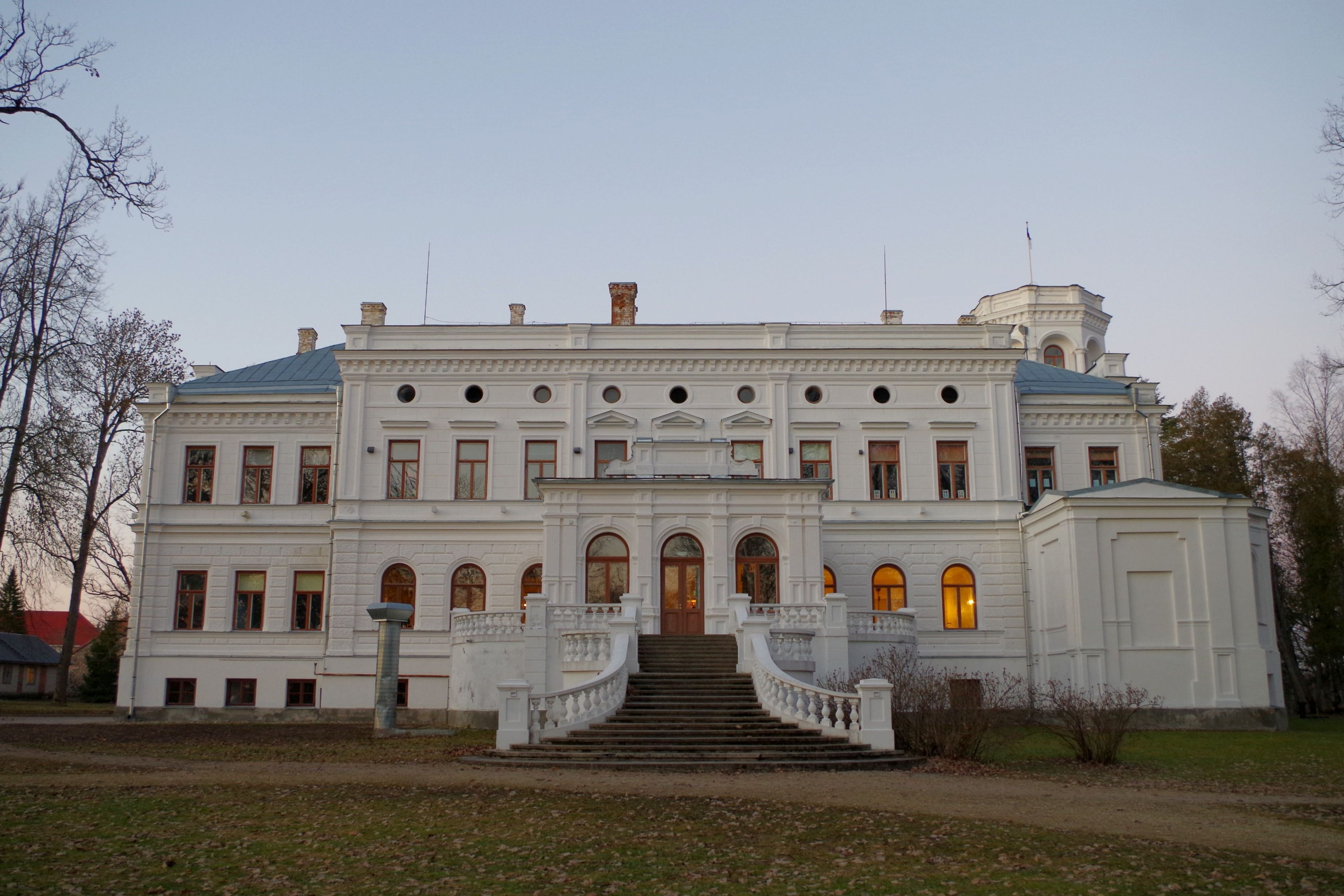
- Puurmani manor

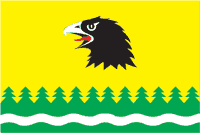
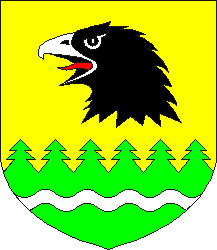
- Flag Coat of arms

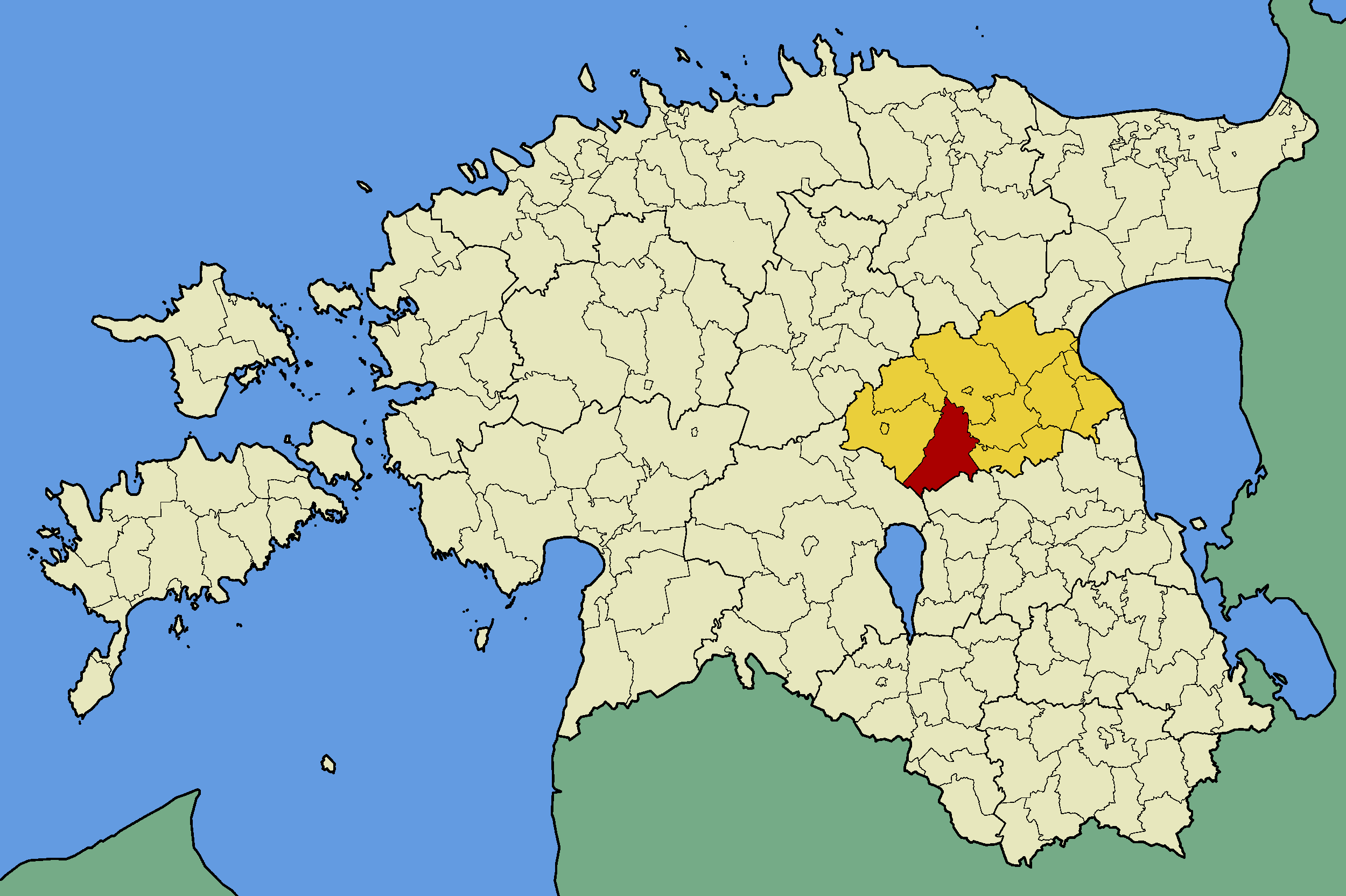
- Puurmani Parish within Jõgeva County.
- Country: Estonia
- County: Jõgeva County
- Administrative centre: Puurmani

Area
  - Total: 292.56 km^{2} (112.96 sq mi)

Population (01.01.2004)
  - Total: 1,895
  - Density: 6.477/km^{2} (16.78/sq mi)
- Website: www.puurmani.ee

Puurmani Parish (Estonian: Puurmani vald) was a rural municipality in eastern Estonia. It was a part of Jõgeva County. The municipality had a population of 1,895 (as of 1 January 2004) and covered an area of 292.56 km^{2}. The population density was 6.5 inhabitants per km^{2}.

Administrative centre of the municipality was Puurmani small borough with population of 800. There were also 12 villages in Puurmani Parish: Altnurga, Härjanurme, Jõune, Jüriküla, Kirikuvalla, Kursi, Laasme, Pikknurme, Pööra, Saduküla, Tammiku, Tõrve.

Pedja River flows through the former municipality.
