= Kivijärv =

Kivijärv (lit. 'Rock Lake') is a common name of lakes in Estonia and may refer to:

- Kivijärv (Kivijärve), a lake in the village of Kivijärve in Jõgeva Parish, Jõgeva County, Estonia
- Kivijärv (Osula), a lake in the village of Osula in Võru Parish, Võru County, Estonia
- Kivijärv (Palumäe), a lake in the village of Palumäe in Kambja Parish, Tartu County, Estonia
- Kivijärv (Pillapalu), a lake in the village of in the village of Pillapalu in Anija Parish, Harju County, Estonia
- Kivijärv (Rahtla), a lake in the village of in the village of Rahtla in Saaremaa Parish, Saare County, Estonia
- Kivijärv (Uibujärve), a lake in the village of Uibujärve in Põlva Parish, Põlva County, Estonia
- Lake Raku, a lake in Tallinn and in the village of Männiku in Saku Parish, Harju County, Estonia, also known as Kivijärv

== See also ==
- Kivijärvi (disambiguation)
