= Kivijärv (Palumäe) =

Lake in Estonia

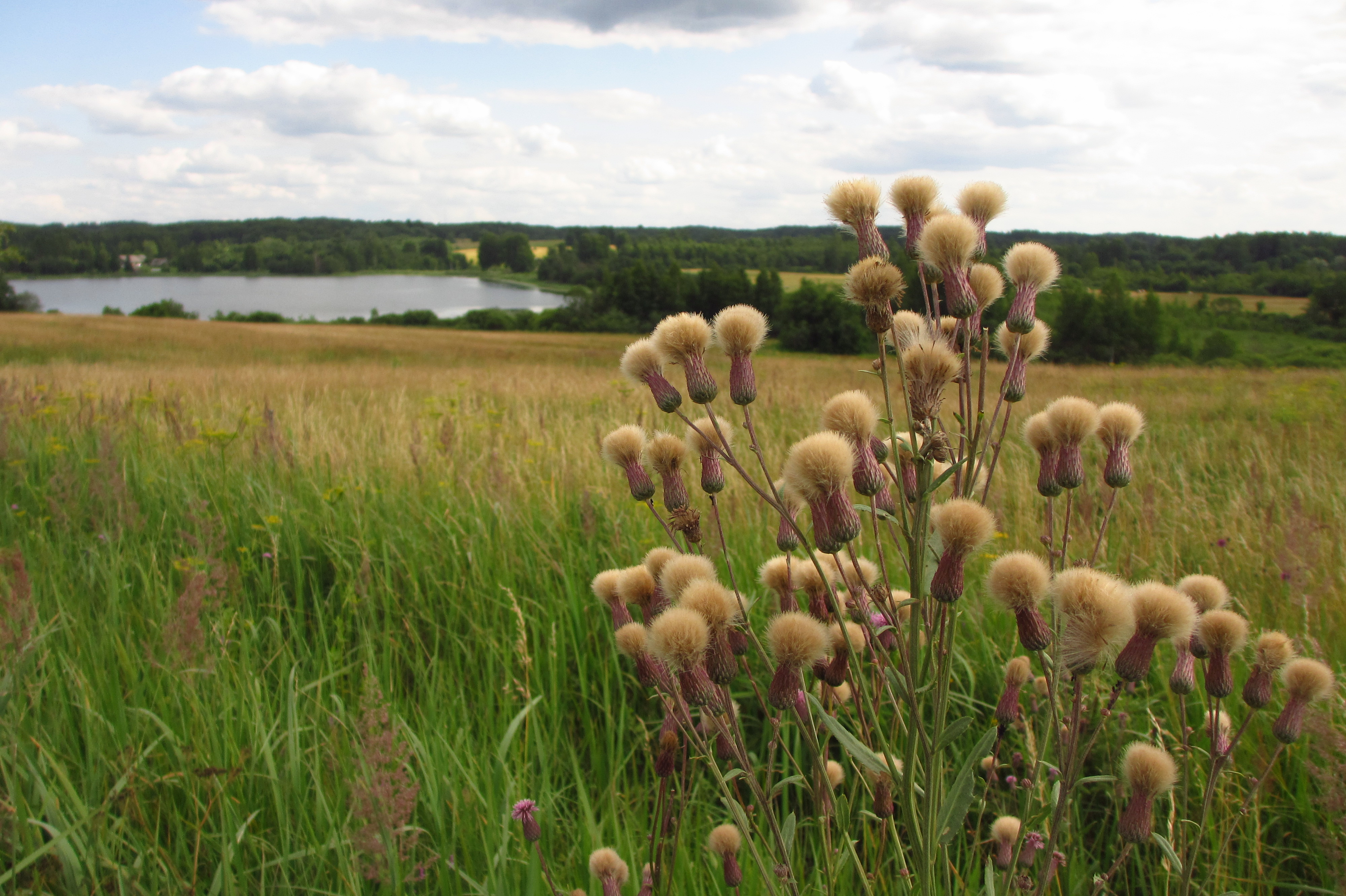

- Location within Estonia
- Coordinates: 58°10′49″N 26°33′46″E
- Basin countries: Estonia
- Max. length: 630 meters (2,070 ft)
- Surface area: 16.7 hectares (41 acres)
- Average depth: 3.0 meters (9.8 ft)
- Max. depth: 6.2 meters (20 ft)
- Shore length^{1}: 1,920 meters (6,300 ft)
- Surface elevation: 108.3 meters (355 ft)
- ^{1} Shore length is not a well-defined measure.

Kivijärv (also Kodijärve Kivijärv, Kodijärv, Mäejärv, Mäekivi järv, or Suur Kodijärv) is a lake in Estonia. It is located in the village of Palumäe in Kambja Parish, Tartu County.

== Physical description ==
The lake has an area of 16.7 hectares (41 acres). The lake has an average depth of 3.0 meters (9.8 ft) and a maximum depth of 6.2 meters (20 ft). It is 630 meters (2,070 ft) long, and its shoreline measures 1,920 meters (6,300 ft).

== Names ==
The name Kivijärv (lit. 'rock lake') is a common designation for lakes in Estonia (compare also the similar Finnish hydronym Kivijärvi). The variant name Kodijärve Kivijärv disinguishes the lake from other Estonian lakes named Kivijärv by referring to the village of Kodijärve, which lies immediately west of the lake. The alternate names Mäejärv (lit. 'hill lake') and Mäekivi järv (lit. 'hill rock lake') refer to the hill that rises northwest of the lake, reaching an elevation of 128.4 meters (421 ft). The alternate name Suur Kodijärv 'Big Kodijärv' semantically contrasts with the smaller lake named Kodijärv 310 meters (1,020 ft) to the west, also known by the variant name Väike Kodijärv 'Little Kodijärv'. This name for Kivijärv sometimes also appears without a modifier, simply as Kodijärv, in which case the smaller lake to the west sometimes bore the name Kogrejärv or Viimakse järv 'Lake Viimakse'.

== Nature conservation ==
Together with Lake Pangodi and Kodijärv, Kivijärv was included in the expanded Pangodi Landscape Conservation Area in 1964. Protective measures for Kivijärv include a 100-meter (330 ft) shoreline restriction zone, a 50-meter (160 ft) shoreline construction prohibition zone, and a 10-meter (33 ft) shoreline water protection zone. Protected species in Kivijärv include the aquatic beetle Dytiscus latissimus and the black tern (Chlidonias niger).

== See also ==
- List of lakes of Estonia
