= Kaarepere railway station =

Railway station in Estonia

Kaarepere
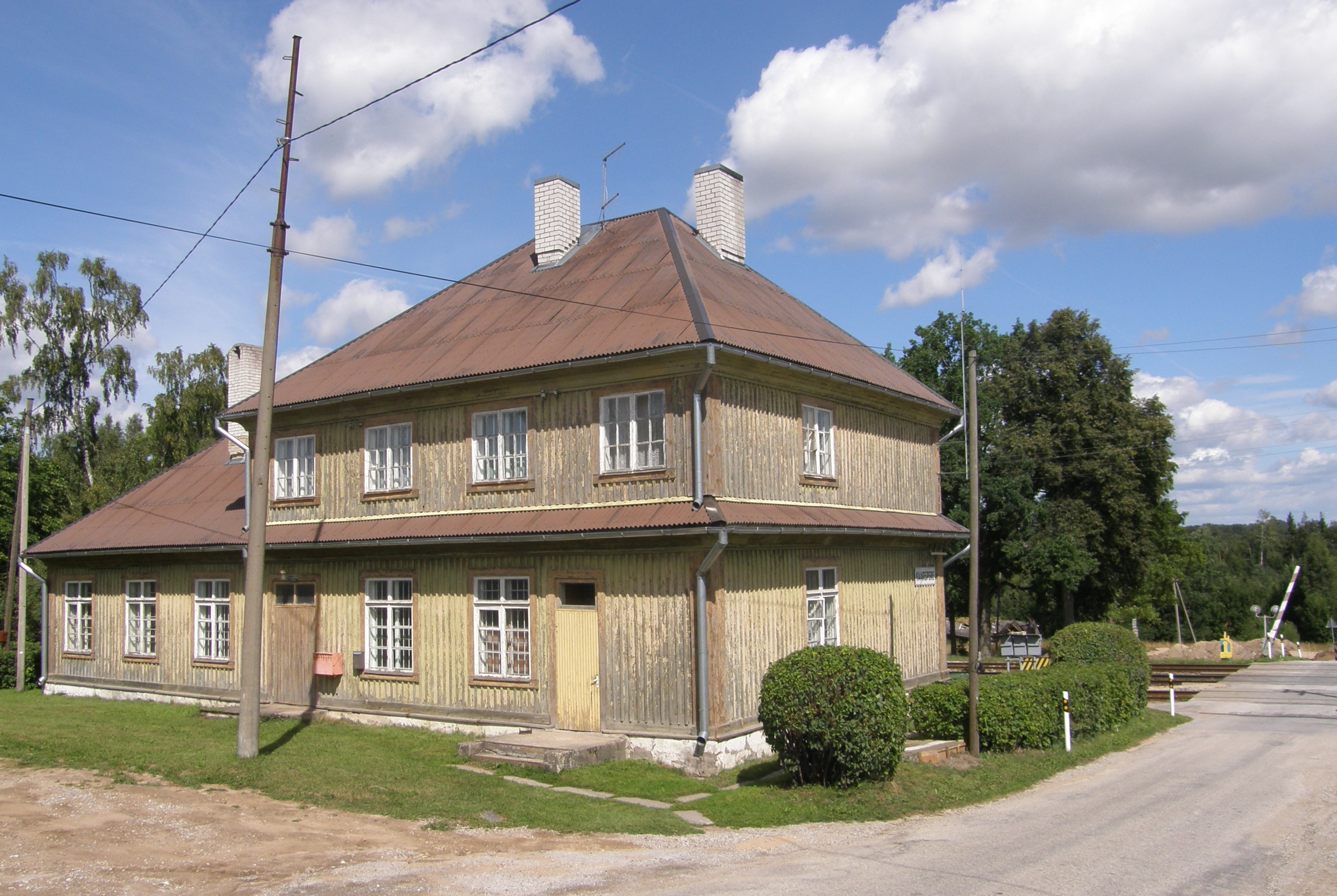
- Rear of the main station building.

General information
- Location: Kassinurme; Jõgeva Parish, Jõgeva County; Estonia
- Coordinates: 58.6614°N 26.5211°E
- System: railway station
- Owner: Eesti Raudtee
- Platforms: 1
- Tracks: 2
- Train operators: Elron

Construction
- Structure type: at-grade
- Accessible: yes

Other information
- Fare zone: None (station-based ticket price)

History
- Opened: 1927; 99 years ago

Services
Preceding station	Elron	Following station
Jõgeva towards Tallinn	Tallinn–Tartu–Valga	Tabivere towards Valga
Jõgeva towards Tallinn	Tallinn–Tartu–Koidula	Tabivere towards Koidula
Location
- Location within Estonia Location within Jõgeva County

Kaarepere railway station (Estonian: Kaarepere raudteejaam) is a historic railway station located in the village of Kassinurme near Kaarepere in eastern Estonia. The station is served by trains heading to Tallinn and Tartu operated by Elron

The station is listed as a heritage building by the Estonian government's Muinsuskaitseamet (Estonian National Heritage Board), number 23960. Construction on the building was finished in 1927. A parking lot was added next to the station in 2011.

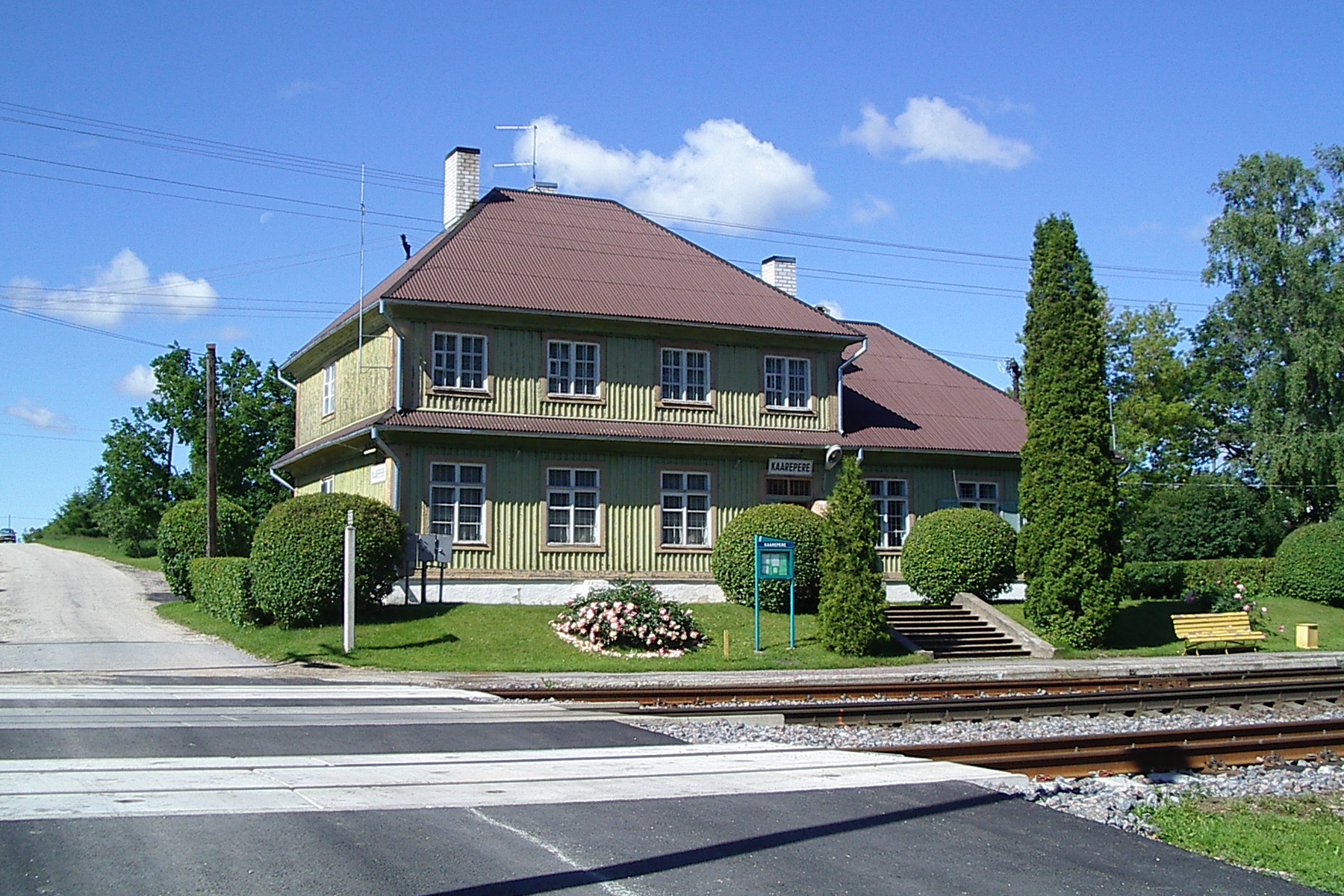
Front of the station building.

== See also ==
- List of railway stations in Estonia
- Rail transport in Estonia
