= Paduvere =

Village in Estonia

Coordinates: 58°48′14″N 26°19′57″E

- Village
- Interactive map of Paduvere
- Country: Estonia
- County: Jõgeva County
- Parish: Jõgeva Parish
- Time zone: UTC+2 (EET)
  - Summer (DST): UTC+3 (EEST)

Paduvere (German: Paddofer) is a village in Jõgeva Parish, Jõgeva County in eastern Estonia.
