= Kivijärv (Rahtla) =

Lake in Estonia

- Location within Estonia
- Coordinates: 58°28′45″N 22°10′30″E
- Basin countries: Estonia
- Surface area: 6.0 hectares (15 acres)
- Shore length^{1}: 1,630 meters (5,350 ft)
- Surface elevation: 4.5 meters (15 ft)
- ^{1} Shore length is not a well-defined measure.

Kivijärv (also Rahtla Kivijärv or Pisike Kaanda järv) is a lake in Estonia. It is located in the village of Rahtla in Saaremaa Parish, Saare County. It is a public lake.

== Physical description ==
The lake has an area of 6.0 hectares (15 acres). It is 350 meters (1,150 ft) long, and its shoreline measures 1,630 meters (5,350 ft). The lake is part of an area traditionally known as the "land of nine lakes" (Estonian: üheksa järve maa); Kivijärv is the fourth in the series of lakes counting inland from the sea.

== Names ==
The name Kivijärv (lit. 'rock lake') is a common designation for lakes in Estonia (compare also the similar Finnish hydronym Kivijärvi). The variant name Rahtla Kivijärv disinguishes the lake from other Estonian lakes named Kivijärv. The alternate name Pisike Kaanda järv 'Tiny Lake Kaanda' shows a triple semantic contrast with Lake Kooru (Kooru järv, alternately known as Big Lake Kaanda, Suur Kaanda järv), Lake Kaanda (Kaanda järv), and Little Lake Kaanda (Estonian: Väike-Kaanda järv). The name Kaanda for these four lakes is also shared by the Kaanda River (Kaanda jõgi), which drains Lake Kooru through an artificial channel dug in 1938, and Kaanda Beach (Kaanda rand), where the chain of lakes finally drains into the sea. The various geographical features are named after the Kaanda farm, which is located in neighboring Merise.

== See also ==
- List of lakes of Estonia
