= Kivijärv (Osula) =

Lake in Estonia

- Location within Estonia
- Coordinates: 57°53′00″N 26°49′28″E
- Basin countries: Estonia
- Max. length: 290 meters (950 ft)
- Surface area: 1.7 hectares (4.2 acres)
- Shore length^{1}: 850 meters (2,790 ft)
- Surface elevation: 77.0 meters (252.6 ft)
- ^{1} Shore length is not a well-defined measure.

Kivijärv (also Osula Kivijärv or Osula paisjärv) is a lake in Estonia. It is located in the village of Osula in Võru Parish, Võru County.

== Physical description ==
The lake has an area of 1.7 hectares (4.2 acres). It is 290 meters (950 ft) long, and its shoreline measures 850 meters (2,790 ft). The lake is fed by rainwater, including discharge carried from the roofs of the houses in the village. The lake empties into the Võhandu River (also known as the Pühäjõgi).

== Names ==
The name Kivijärv (lit. 'rock lake') is a common designation for lakes in Estonia (compare also the similar Finnish hydronym Kivijärvi). The variant name Osula Kivijärv disinguishes the lake from other Estonian lakes named Kivijärv. The alternate name Osula paisjärv 'Osula Reservoir' (cf. paisjärv 'reservoir, artificial lake' < pais 'dam, weir, dike' + järv 'lake') refers to the fact that the lake was created when a dam was installed for a mill.

== Recreation ==
Fishing is permitted in the lake, and the lake is stocked with northern pike. The lakeshore is a local recreation site during the summer.

== See also ==
- List of lakes of Estonia
