= Kivijärve =

Village in Estonia

Coordinates: 58°46′N 26°34′E

- Village
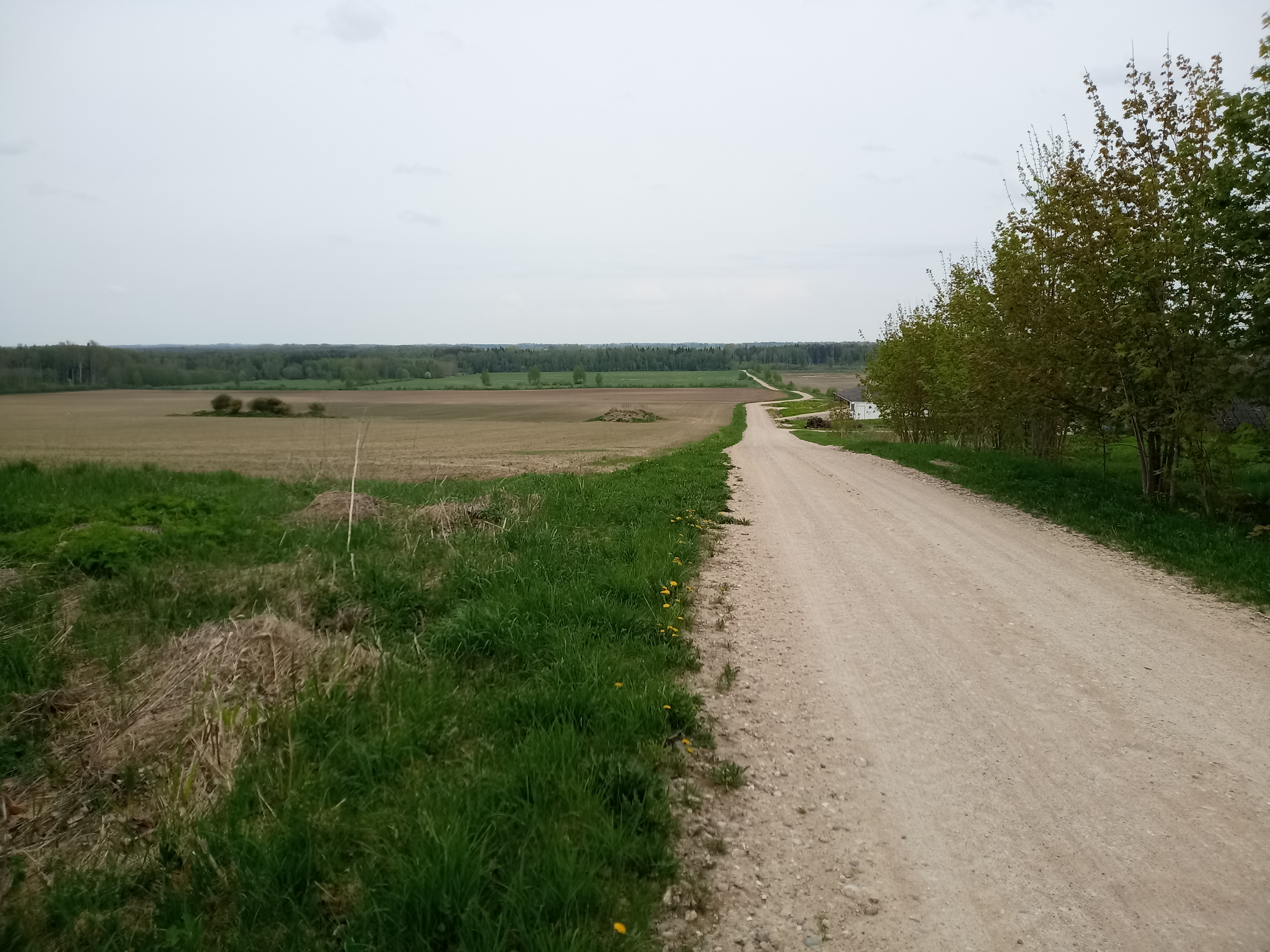
- The road from Kuremaa to Kaude in Kivijärve
- Interactive map of Kivijärve
- Country: Estonia
- County: Jõgeva County
- Parish: Jõgeva Parish
- Time zone: UTC+2 (EET)
  - Summer (DST): UTC+3 (EEST)

Kivijärve (German: Kibbijerw) is a village in Jõgeva Parish, Jõgeva County in eastern Estonia.
