= Lake Endla =

Lake in Estonia

- Endla järv (Estonian)
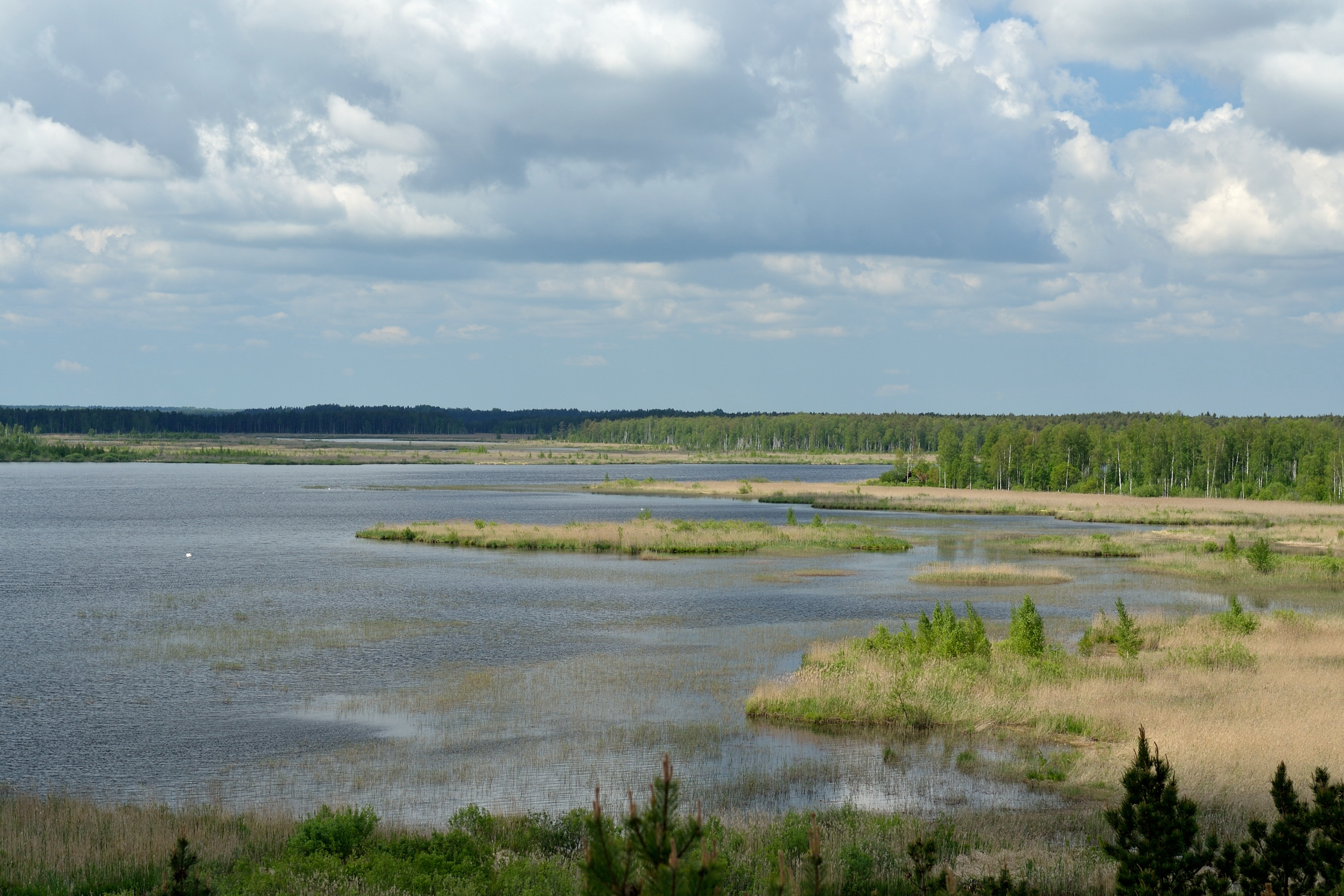

- Location within Estonia
- Location: Jõgeva County, Estonia
- Coordinates: 58°51′N 26°12′E
- Basin countries: Estonia
- Max. length: 2,840 meters (9,320 ft)
- Surface area: 284.9 hectares (704 acres)
- Average depth: 1.1 meters (3 ft 7 in)
- Max. depth: 2.7 meters (8 ft 10 in)
- Water volume: 3,097,000 cubic meters (109,400,000 cu ft)
- Shore length^{1}: 30,410 meters (99,770 ft)
- Surface elevation: 75.7 meters (248 ft)
- Islands: 23

Ramsar Wetland
- Official name: Endla järv
- Designated: 17 June 1997
- Reference no.: 907
- ^{1} Shore length is not a well-defined measure.

Lake Endla (Estonian: Endla järv) is a lake in Estonia. It is mostly located in the village of Kärde, with a small part in neighboring Tooma, in Jõgeva Parish, Jõgeva County.

== Physical description ==
The lake has an area of 284.9 hectares (704 acres), and it has 23 islands with a combined area of 45.6 hectares (113 acres). The lake has an average depth of 1.1 meters (3 ft 7 in) and a maximum depth of 2.7 meters (8 ft 10 in). It is 2,840 meters (9,320 ft) long, and its shoreline measures 30,410 meters (99,770 ft). It has a volume of 3,097,000 cubic meters (109,400,000 cu ft).

== See also ==
- List of lakes of Estonia
