= Ellakvere =

Village in Estonia

- Village
- Interactive map of Ellakvere
- Coordinates: 58°45′N 26°25′E
- Country: Estonia
- County: Jõgeva County
- Parish: Jõgeva Parish

Population (2019-01-01)
  - Total: 85
- Time zone: UTC+2 (EET)
  - Summer (DST): UTC+3 (EEST)

Ellakvere is a village in Jõgeva Parish, Jõgeva County in eastern Estonia. The village is known for the garlic grown there.

Its EHAK (Eesti haldus- ja asustusjaotuse klassifikaator) code is 1582.
