= Lake Prossa =

Lake in Estonia

- Prossa järv (Estonian)
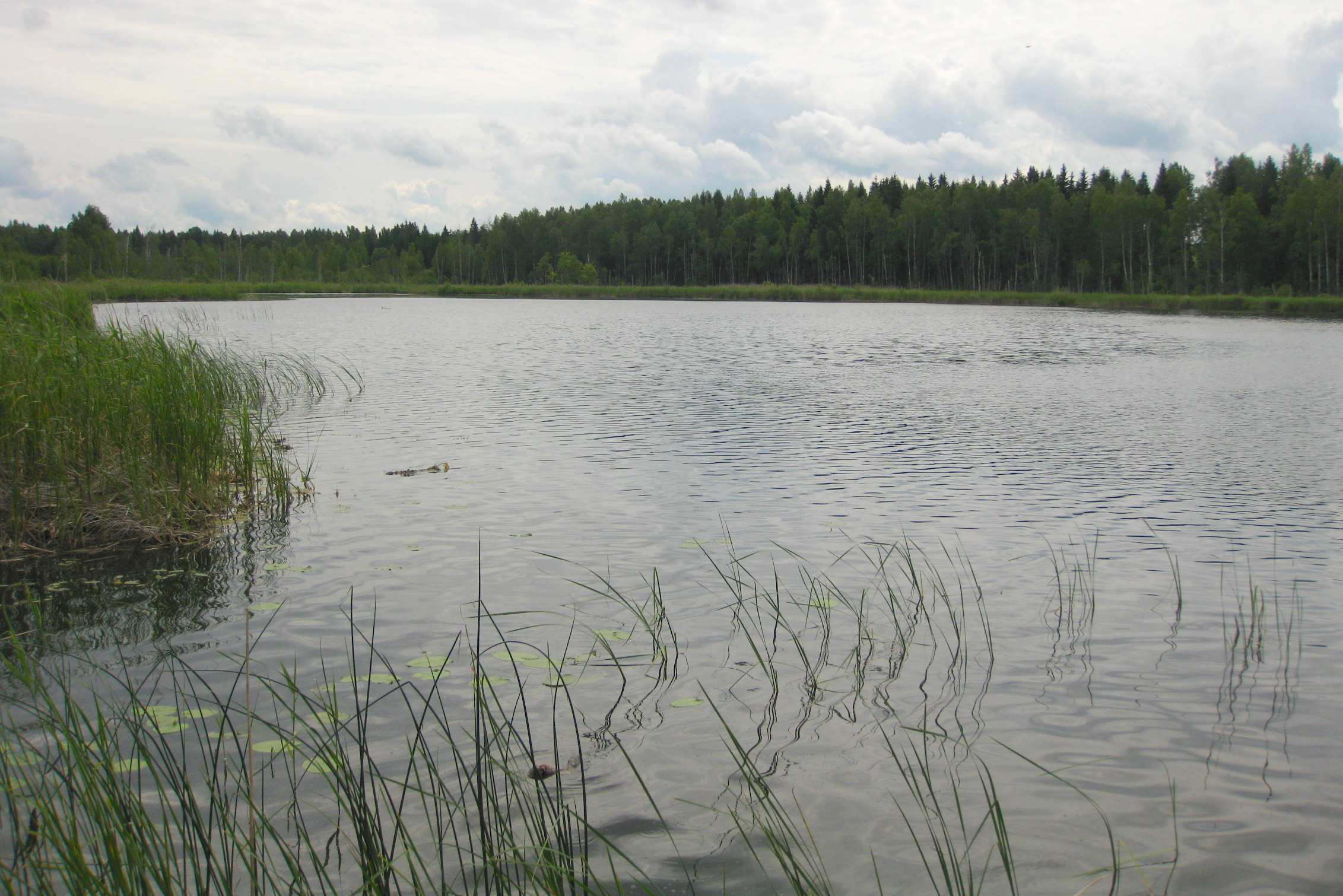

- Location within Estonia
- Coordinates: 58.650431°N 26.576357°E
- Basin countries: Estonia
- Max. length: 1,480 meters (4,860 ft)
- Surface area: 31.0 hectares (77 acres)
- Average depth: 2.2 meters (7 ft 3 in)
- Max. depth: 4.3 meters (14 ft)
- Water volume: 698,000 cubic meters (24,600,000 cu ft)
- Shore length^{1}: 3,280 meters (10,760 ft)
- Surface elevation: 61.1 meters (200 ft)
- ^{1} Shore length is not a well-defined measure.

Lake Prossa (Estonian: Prossa järv) is a lake in central Estonia. It is located in the village of Pikkjärve in Jõgeva Parish, Jõgeva County.

== Physical description ==
The lake has an area of 31.0 hectares (77 acres). The lake has an average depth of 2.2 meters (7 ft 3 in) and a maximum depth of 4.3 meters (14 ft). It is 1,480 meters (4,860 ft) long, and its shoreline measures 3,280 meters (10,760 ft). It has a volume of 698,000 cubic meters (24,600,000 cu ft).

== See also ==
- List of lakes of Estonia
