= Härjanurme =

Härjanurme may refer to several places in Estonia:

- Härjanurme, Jõgeva County, village in Jõgeva Parish, Jõgeva County
- Härjanurme, Tartu County, village in Elva Parish, Tartu County
