= Selli, Estonia =

Village in Estonia

Coordinates: 58°53′N 26°18′E

Selli
- Village
- Interactive map of Selli
- Country: Estonia
- County: Jõgeva County
- Parish: Jõgeva Parish
- Time zone: UTC+2 (EET)
  - Summer (DST): UTC+3 (EEST)

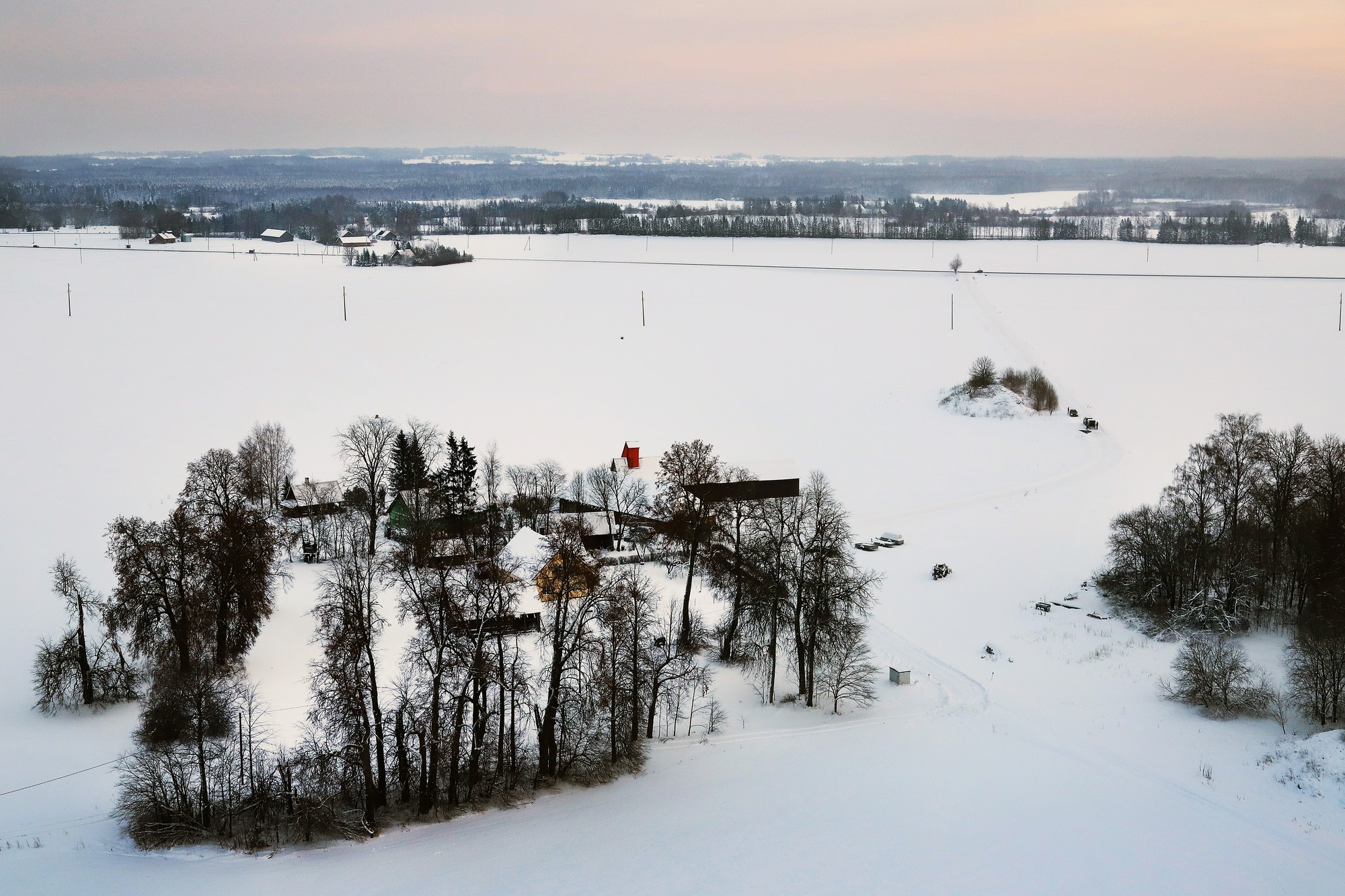
Selli in winter

Selli (German: Sellie) is a village in Jõgeva Parish, Jõgeva County in eastern Estonia.
