= Vana-Jõgeva =

Village in Estonia

Coordinates: 58°44′N 26°25′E

- Village
- Interactive map of Vana-Jõgeva
- Country: Estonia
- County: Jõgeva County
- Parish: Jõgeva Parish
- Time zone: UTC+2 (EET)
  - Summer (DST): UTC+3 (EEST)

Vana-Jõgeva is a village in Jõgeva Parish, Jõgeva County in eastern Estonia.
