= Kaera =

Village in Estonia

Coordinates: 58°46′36″N 26°19′15″E

- Village
- Interactive map of Kaera
- Country: Estonia
- County: Jõgeva County
- Parish: Jõgeva Parish
- Time zone: UTC+2 (EET)
  - Summer (DST): UTC+3 (EEST)

Kaera is a village in Jõgeva Parish, Jõgeva County in eastern Estonia.
