= Soomevere =

Soomevere may refer to several places in Estonia:

- Soomevere, Jõgeva County, village in Jõgeva Parish, Jõgeva County
- Soomevere, Viljandi County, village in Põhja-Sakala Parish, Viljandi County
