= Ouna =

Ouna refer to:

- Ouna, County Antrim, a townland in County Antrim, Northern Ireland (also known as Eagle Hill)
- Õuna, a town in Estonia
- Ouna, a Japanese satellite
