= Pakaste =

Village in Estonia

Coordinates: 58°42′01″N 26°23′50″E

- Village
- Interactive map of Pakaste
- Country: Estonia
- County: Jõgeva County
- Parish: Jõgeva Parish
- Time zone: UTC+2 (EET)
  - Summer (DST): UTC+3 (EEST)

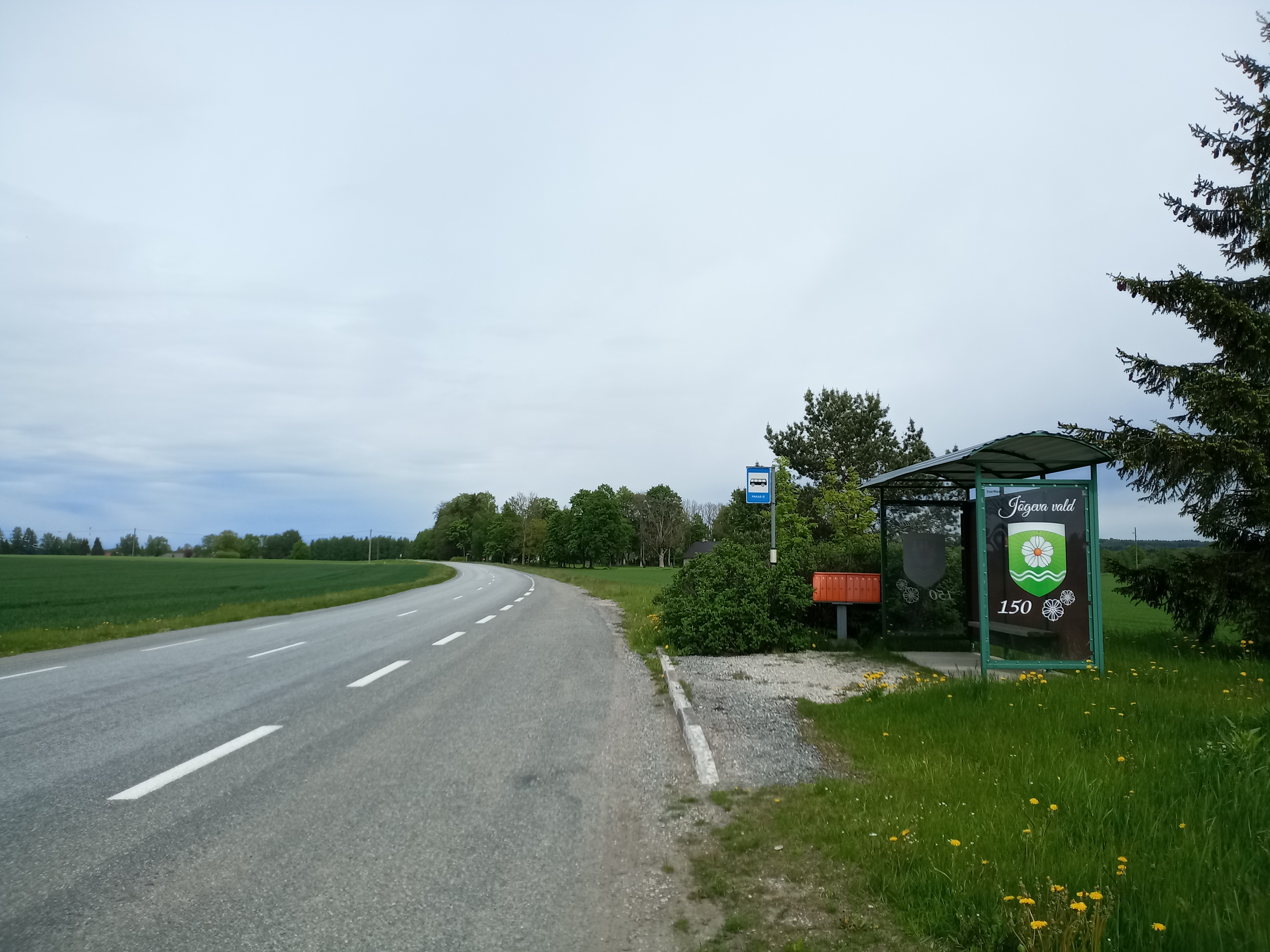
Pakaste village bus stop, May 2021

Pakaste is a village in Jõgeva Parish, Jõgeva County in eastern Estonia.
