= Aleksander Tõnisson =

Estonian military commander

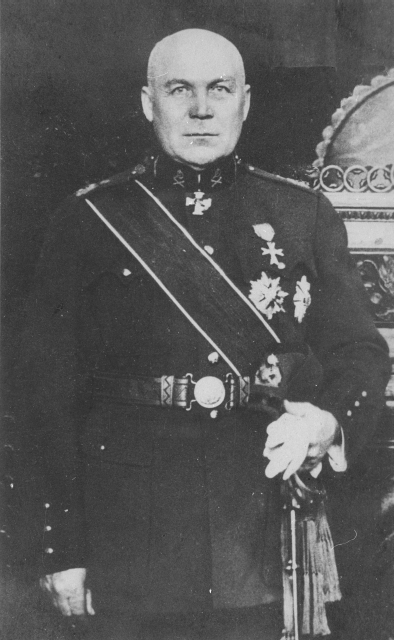
- Born: 17 April 1875; Pööra, Härjanurme Parish, Kreis Dorpat, Governorate of Livonia, Russian Empire (now Pööra, Jõgeva Parish, Estonia)
- Died: 30 June 1941 (aged 66); Tallinn, Estonia
- Military career
- Allegiance: Russian Empire; Estonia
- Service years: 1899–1917 (Russia); 1918–1934 (Estonia)
- Rank: Kindralmajor
- Units: Imperial Russian Army; Estonian Army
- Conflicts: Russo-Japanese War; World War I; Estonian War of Independence; Battle of Krivasoo
- Awards: Cross of Liberty

Aleksander Tõnisson VR I/1 (17 April 1875 – 30 June 1941) was an Estonian military commander (Major General) during the Estonian War of Independence.

In 1899, he graduated from Vilnius Military Academy. Tõnisson participated in the Russo-Japanese War and in World War I. In 1917, he participated in formation of Estonian national units and as commander of 1st Estonian regiment participated in battles at Riga front. In 1918, he escaped from German occupation to Finland, returned in autumn and became commander of 1st Division of Estonia. During the Estonian Liberation War, Tõnisson fought successfully at Viru Front. After war, he served twice as minister of defence, in 1934 he retired from military and was mayor of Tartu 1934–1939 and Lord Mayor (ülemlinnapea) of Tallinn from 1939 to 1940. In 1940, Soviet occupation authorities arrested Tõnisson and executed him the following year.

== Honours and awards ==
- Order of St. Vladimir, 4th class; for distinguished service
- Cross of Liberty, first-class, first degree.
- Commander of the Order of the Cross of the Eagle
- Protection of Natural Amenities Medal, 2nd Rank

Political offices
Preceded by August Hanko	Minister of War; 1920	Succeeded by Ants Piip
Preceded by August Kerem	Minister of Defence; 1932–1933	Succeeded by August Kerem
Preceded by Hans Ainson	Mayor of Tartu; 1934–1939	Succeeded by Robert Sinka
Preceded by Jaan Soots	Lord Mayor of Tallinn; 1939–1940	Succeeded by Aleksander Kiidelmaa
