= Tooma, Estonia =

Village in Estonia

Coordinates: 58°52′24″N 26°16′33″E

Tooma
- Village
- Interactive map of Tooma
- Country: Estonia
- County: Jõgeva County
- Parish: Jõgeva Parish
- Time zone: UTC+2 (EET)
  - Summer (DST): UTC+3 (EEST)

Tooma is a village in Jõgeva Parish, Jõgeva County in eastern Estonia.
