= Vägeva =

Village in Estonia

Coordinates: 58°54′N 26°17′E

- Village
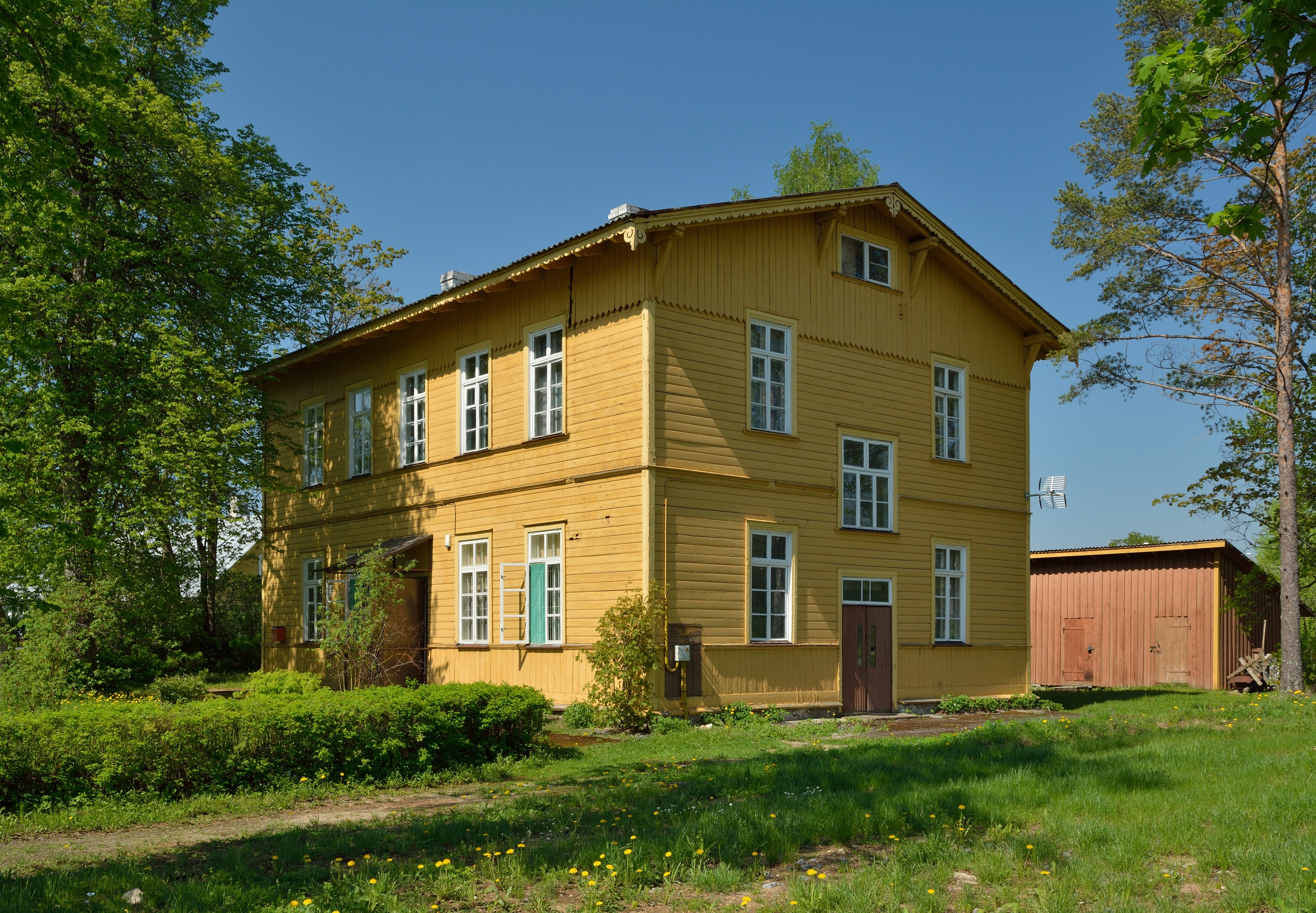
- Interactive map of Vägeva
- Country: Estonia
- County: Jõgeva County
- Parish: Jõgeva Parish
- Time zone: UTC+2 (EET)
  - Summer (DST): UTC+3 (EEST)

Vägeva (German: Wäggeva) is a village in Jõgeva Parish, Jõgeva County in eastern Estonia.

Preceding station	Elron	Following station
Rakke towards Tallinn	Tallinn–Tartu–Valga	Pedja towards Valga
Rakke towards Tallinn	Tallinn–Tartu–Koidula	Pedja towards Koidula
