= Pedja =

Village in Estonia

Coordinates: 58°50′N 26°21′E

- Village
- Interactive map of Pedja
- Country: Estonia
- County: Jõgeva County
- Parish: Jõgeva Parish
- Time zone: UTC+2 (EET)
  - Summer (DST): UTC+3 (EEST)

Pedja is a village in Jõgeva Parish, Jõgeva County in eastern Estonia.

Preceding station	Elron	Following station
Vägeva towards Tallinn	Tallinn–Tartu–Valga	Jõgeva towards Valga
Vägeva towards Tallinn	Tallinn–Tartu–Koidula	Jõgeva towards Koidula
