= Elise Käer-Kingisepp =

Estonian physician, pharmacologist

- Born: 3 October 1901; Laius-Tähkvere Parish (now Jõgeva Parish), Kreis Dorpat, Governorate of Livonia, Russian Empire
- Died: 10 February 1989 (aged 87); Tartu, Estonia
- Education: University of Tartu (M.D.)
- Spouse: Georg Kingisepp
- Scientific career
- Fields: Pharmacology, physiology, and sports medicine
- Workplaces: University of Tartu

Elise Käer-Kingisepp (née Käer; 3 October 1901 – 10 February 1989) was an Estonian physician, pharmacologist, physiologist and sports medicine specialist. She was one of the founders of the Estonian Association of University Women (Estonian: Eesti Akadeemiliste Naiste Ühing (EANÜ)) and was the second female scientist to graduate from the University of Tartu in Estonia.

== Early life and education ==
Elise Käer-Kingisepp was born on 3 October 1901 in Laius-Tähkvere vald, in the Governorate of Livonia of the Russian Empire (now Estonia). The Germans occupied Tartu in 1918 during World War I and she was forced to switch schools after most of the Russified teachers had fled. She graduated in early 1919, but her diploma did not qualify her to be admitted in the University of Tartu. Käer-Kingisepp had to settle for enrolling as an auditing student and had to take additional exams before she could enroll as a normal student in May 1920, graduating four years later. She was accepted for graduate work in the department of chemistry of the university in late 1924 although she had to teach school to pay her tuition.

== Career ==
She married the pharmacologist Georg Kingisepp in 1931 and they had two children. Käer-Kingisepp received her M.D. three years later. She was appointed as an assistant professor in pharmacology at the University of Tartu in 1939 and was promoted in 1941. During World War II, she worked in the laboratory of a pharmaceutical company and was promoted to full professor and the chair of the physiology and biological chemistry department. Elise Käer-Kingisepp served as the chair of the department of physiology from 1948 to 1975 and was the chairperson of the Estonian Society of Physiology from 1953 to 1980. She died on 10 February 1989 in Tartu.

Käer-Kingisepp proposed creating an association of university women in 1925 and was one of the founders of the EANÜ on 2 May 1926. She served as the vice-chairwoman (1925–1936) and as chair of its medical committee (1936–1940).

== Notes ==
=== Bibliography ===
- Tamul, Sirje (2005). "Käer-Kingisepp, Elise". In Haan, Francisca de; Daskalova, Krassimira; Loutfi, Anna (eds.). Biographical Dictionary of Women's Movements and Feminisms in Central, Eastern, and South Eastern Europe: 19th and 20th Centuries. New York: Central European University Press. ISBN 978-963-7326-39-4.
