= Õuna =

Village in Estonia

Coordinates: 58°45′N 26°21′E

- Village
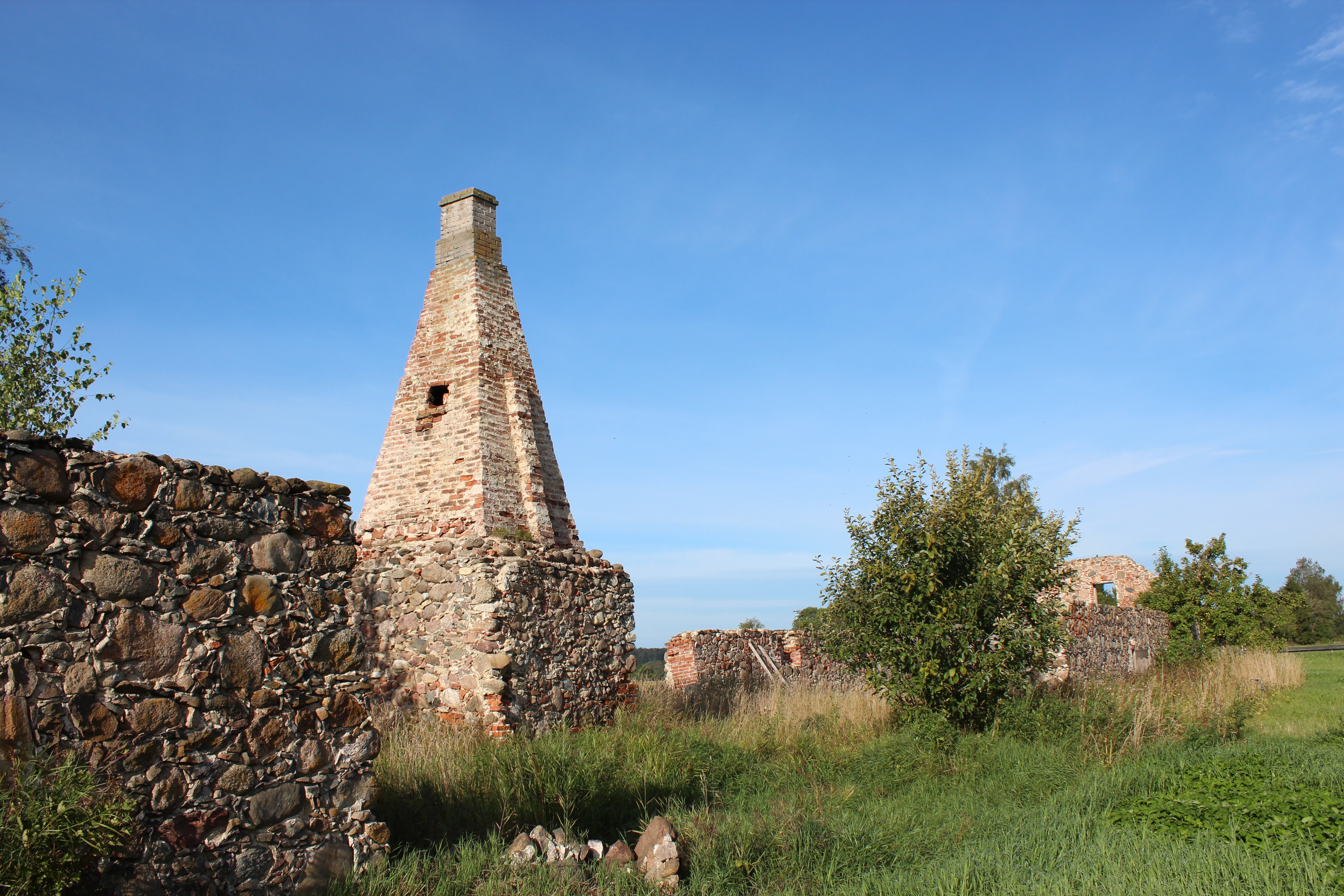
- Ruins of Õuna Inn.
- Interactive map of Õuna
- Country: Estonia
- County: Jõgeva County
- Parish: Jõgeva Parish

Population
  - Total: 142
- Time zone: UTC+2 (EET)
  - Summer (DST): UTC+3 (EEST)

Õuna is a village in Jõgeva Parish, Jõgeva County in eastern Estonia.
