= Kivijärv (Kivijärve) =

Lake in Estonia

- Location within Estonia
- Coordinates: 58°46′34″N 26°32′34″E
- Basin countries: Estonia
- Max. length: 1,340 meters (4,400 ft)
- Surface area: 26.5 hectares (65 acres)
- Average depth: 1.5 meters (4 ft 11 in)
- Max. depth: 2.0 meters (6 ft 7 in)
- Shore length^{1}: 9,620 meters (31,560 ft)
- Surface elevation: 83.5 meters (274 ft)
- Islands: 3
- ^{1} Shore length is not a well-defined measure.

Kivijärv (also Lauise Kivijärv) is a lake in Estonia. It is located in the village of Kivijärve in Jõgeva Parish, Jõgeva County.

== Physical description ==
The lake has an area of 26.5 hectares (65 acres), and it has three islands with a combined area of 0.2 hectares (0.49 acres). The lake has an average depth of 1.5 meters (4 ft 11 in) and a maximum depth of 2.0 meters (6 ft 7 in). It is 1,340 meters (4,400 ft) long, and its shoreline measures 9,620 meters (31,560 ft).

== See also ==
- List of lakes of Estonia
