= Pööra =

Village in Estonia

- Village
- Location in Estonia
- Coordinates: 58°39′06″N 26°16′53″E
- Country: Estonia
- County: Jõgeva County
- Municipality: Jõgeva Parish

Population (2011 Census)
  - Total: 96

Pööra is a village in Jõgeva Parish, Jõgeva County, Estonia. It's located about 9 km (6 mi) north of Puurmani, 12 km (7 mi) southwest of town of Jõgeva and 17 km (11 mi) east of town of Põltsamaa.

As of the 2011 census, the settlement's population was 96.

Military commander Aleksander Tõnisson (1875–1941) was born in Pööra.
