= Pikkjärve, Jõgeva County =

Village in Estonia

Coordinates: 58°38′50″N 26°32′48″E

Pikkjärve
- Village
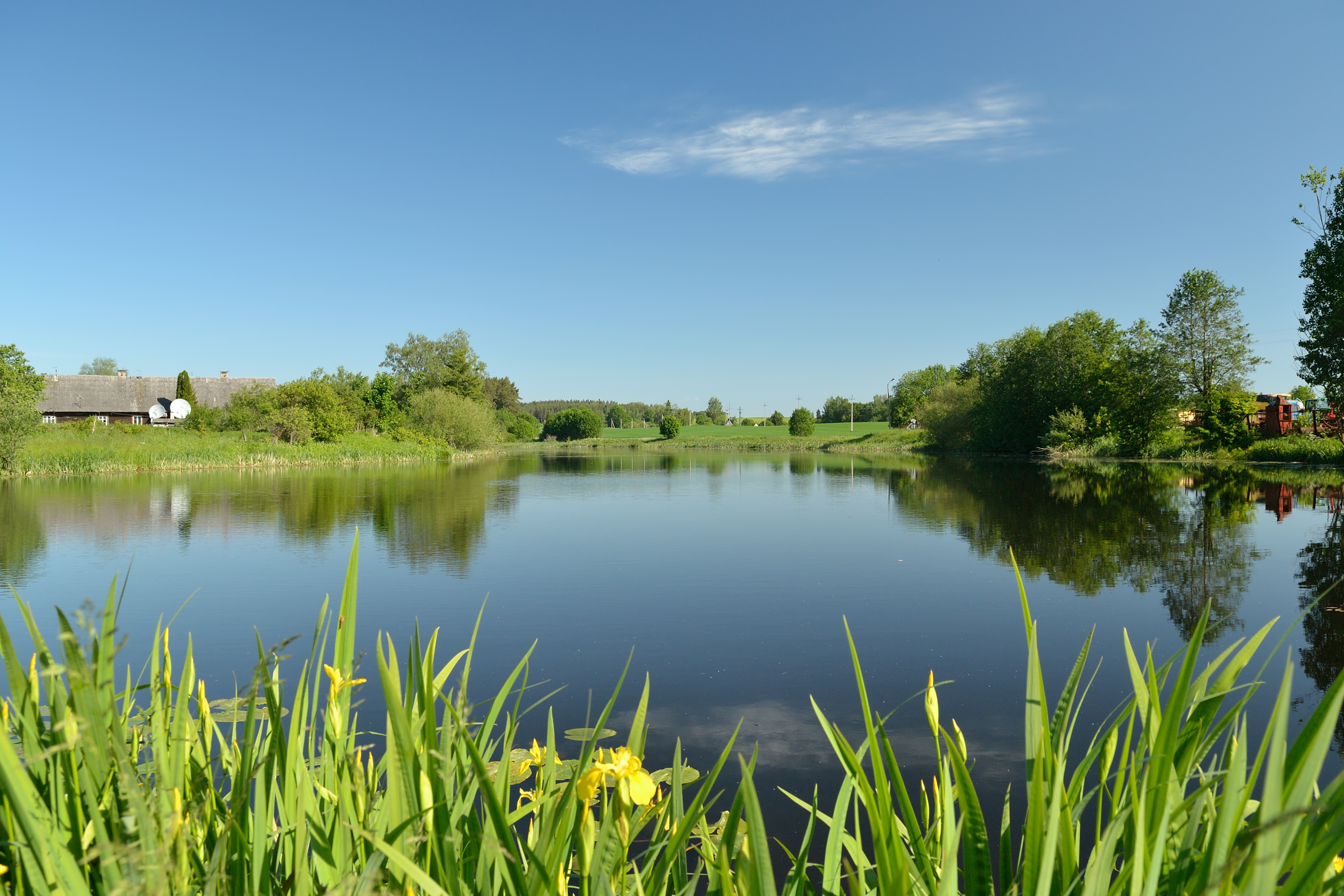
- Pikkjärve dam lake
- Interactive map of Pikkjärve
- Country: Estonia
- County: Jõgeva County
- Parish: Jõgeva Parish
- Time zone: UTC+2 (EET)
  - Summer (DST): UTC+3 (EEST)

Pikkjärve is a village in Jõgeva Parish, Jõgeva County in eastern Estonia.
