= Virve Aruoja =

Estonian television and film director

Virve Aruoja (since 1978 Virve Aruoja-Hellström; 19 February 1922 in Saduküla – 15 September 2013) was an Estonian television and film director and former actress.

Aruoja graduated from the University of Tartu's Tartu Teachers' Seminary in 1941. She studied at the State Drama Studio in Tallinn from 1945 until 1947, then continued her studies at the Estonian Studio of the Russian Institute of Theatre Arts (GITIS) in Moscow, graduating in 1953. In 1984 received a master's degree in philology from Uppsala University in Sweden.

From 1942 until 1945, she was an actress and member of the Vanemuine Opera Choir. From 1945 until 1947, she was engaged as an actress at the Estonian Drama Theatre in Tallinn. In 1947, she returned to Tartu and the Vanemuine as an actress until 1949. From 1953 until 1956, she returned to the stage of the Estonian Drama Theatre.

From 1956 until 1978, she was an assistant director and director at Eesti Televisioon (ETV), and a film director at Tallinnfilm from 1972 until 1976.

In 2001 she was awarded with Order of the White Star, V class.

Aruoja lived in Sweden from 1978 until 1994, when she returned to Estonia. She spent the last years of her life on the island of Hiiumaa.

== Selected filmography ==
- 1960 Näitleja Joller (television film; director)
- 1962 Romantikud (television film; director)
- 1966 Ühe suve akvarellid (television film; director)
- 1968 Tädi Rose (television film; director)
- 1970 Kolme katku vahel (television film; director)
- 1971 Lõppematu päev (television film; director)
- 1973 Laulab Tiit Kuusik (music film; director)
- 1974 "Ooperiball" (music film; scenarist)
- 1974 Värvilised unenäod (feature film; director)
- 1976 Minu naine sai vanaemaks (television film; director and scenarist)
