= Kaarepere =

Village in Estonia

Coordinates: 58°40′N 26°32′E

- Village
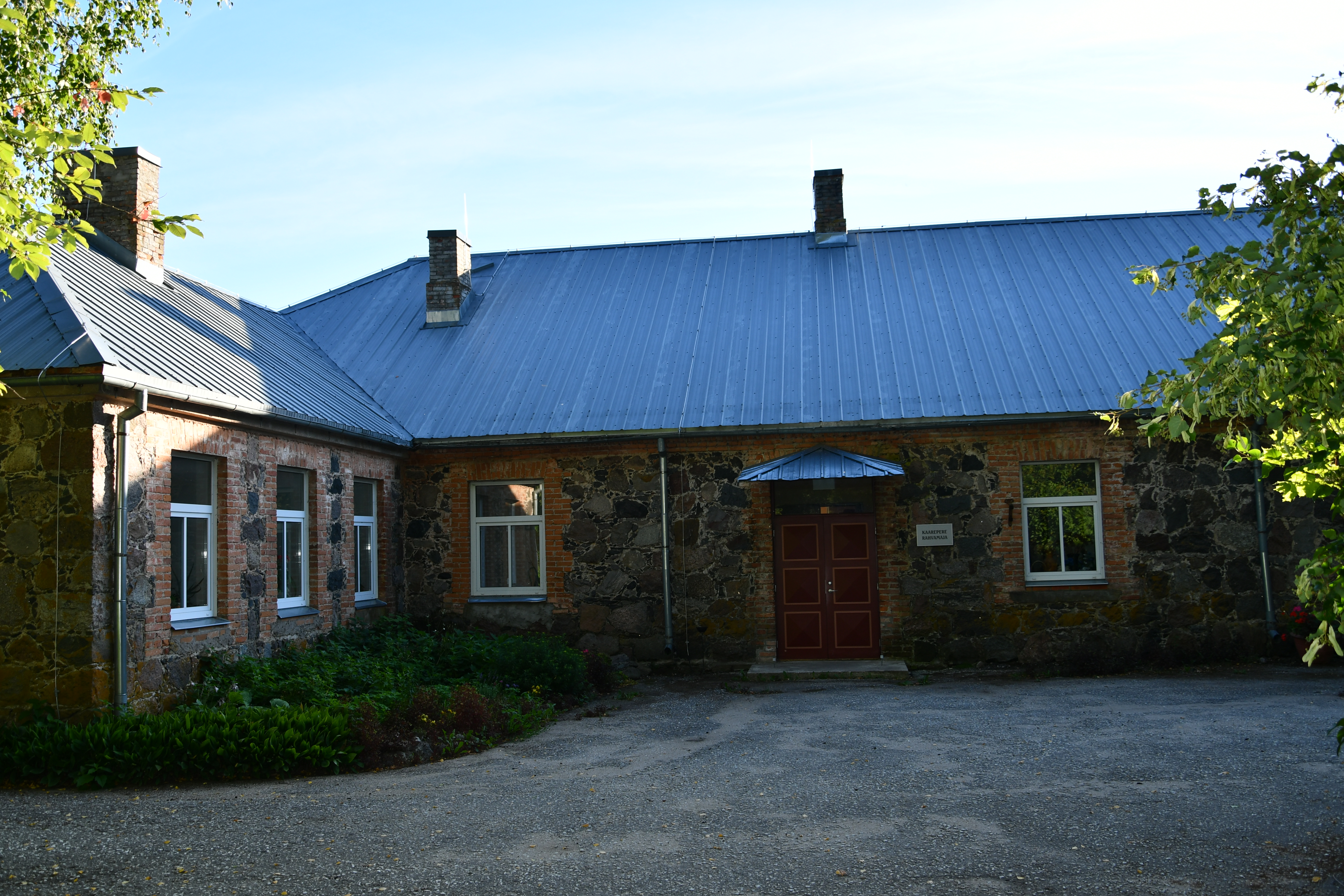
- Interactive map of Kaarepere
- Country: Estonia
- County: Jõgeva County
- Parish: Jõgeva Parish
- Time zone: UTC+2 (EET)
  - Summer (DST): UTC+3 (EEST)

Kaarepere (German: Kersel) is a village in Jõgeva Parish, Jõgeva County in eastern Estonia.

Kaarepere is served by Kaarepere railway station.
