= Battle of Krivasoo =

1919 military conflict in Estonia during Estonian War of Independence

- Part of Estonian War of Independence
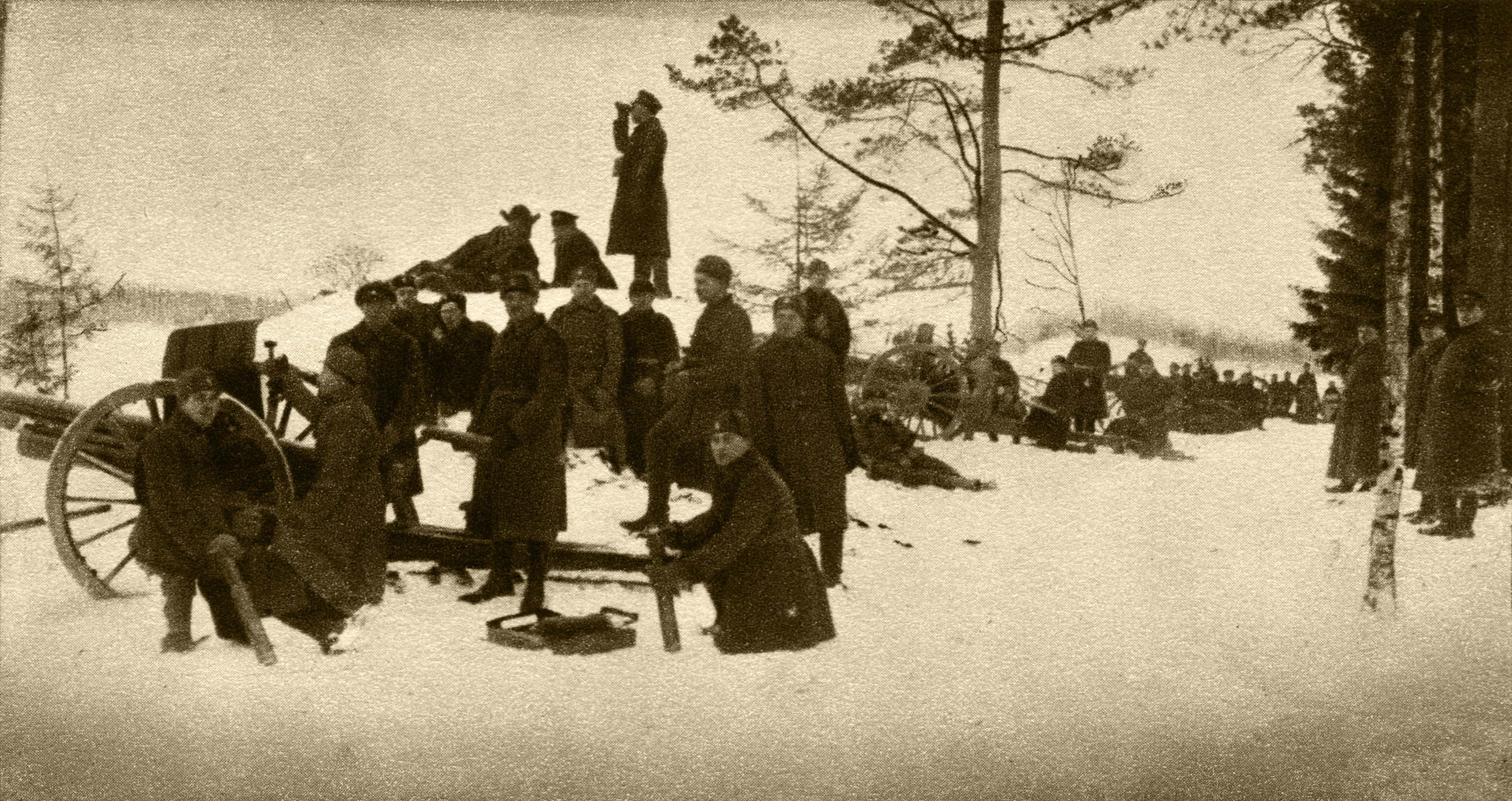
- Estonian field battery No.2 near Narva in November–December 1919, Jaan Tõnisson is seen observing using binoculars
Date	18 November 1919 – 30 December 1919
Location	Krivasoo, Estonia 59°15′21″N 27°55′57″E
Result	Estonian victory

Belligerents
Estonia	Soviet Russia

Commanders and leaders
Aleksander Tõnisson	Vladimir Gittis

Strength
15,000 men 160 cannons	40,000 men 200 cannons

Casualties and losses
Unknown	Approx. 35,000

Battle of Krivasoo (Estonian: Krivasoo lahing; 18 November 1919 - 30 December 1919) took place near the Krivasoo, Estonia during the Estonian War of Independence between the Estonian Army and the Red Army. It is considered one of the last engagements of the conflict before a ceasefire was called in early January 1920.

Fighting around Krivasoo began in the wake of the retreat of the Northwestern Army after it failed to take the city of Petrograd. The 7th and 15th Soviet Armies, advancing behind collapsing White Russian forces, began their attack as they approached the fortified positions at the state border near Narva. The first clashes took place on Luga River on 16 November, starting the conclusive battles with 120,000 Soviets facing 40,000 Estonians. After repeated attacks, the 7th Red Army managed to achieve some limited success. At the end of November, the situation on the front calmed, as the Soviets needed to replenish their forces. In order to pressure Estonia in the peace talks, intensive Soviet attacks restarted on 7 December. On 16 December, the situation became critical as forward units of the 15th Red Army crossed the Narva River. The next day, an Estonian counterattack pushed the Soviets back. The Estonian high command actively reinforced the 1st Division at Narva during the battles, sending in the headquarters of the 3rd Division. General Tõnisson became commander of the Viru Front. After suffering 35,000 casualties in heavy battles, the Red Army was completely exhausted by the end of December. By this time, negotiations with Bolshevik representatives brokered a ceasefire between the Red Army and the Estonian forces.
