= Lake Raku =

Lake in Estonia

- Raku järv (Estonian)
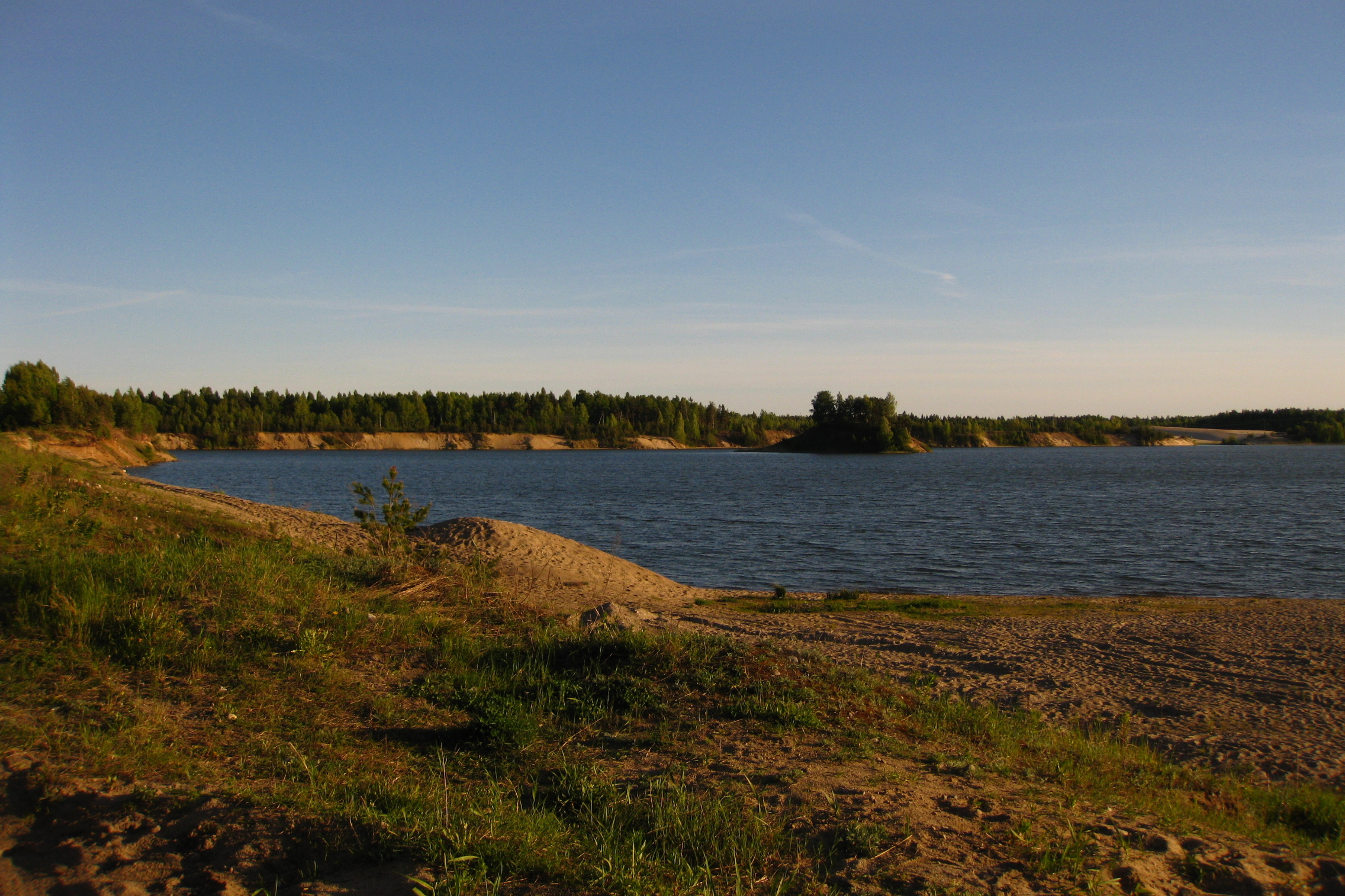

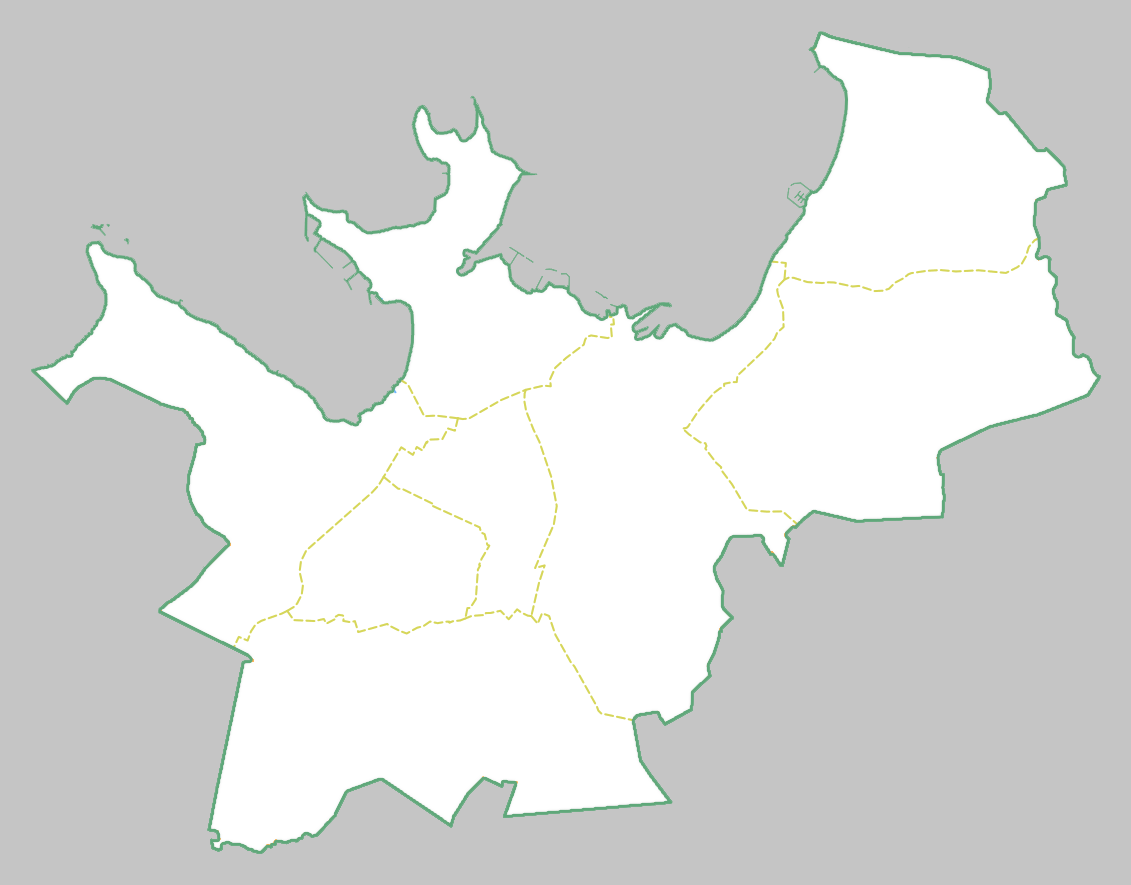
- Location within Tallinn
- Coordinates: 59°21′28″N 24°44′45″E
- Basin countries: Estonia
- Max. length: 2,920 meters (9,580 ft)
- Surface area: 219.8 hectares (543 acres)
- Average depth: 6.4 meters (21 ft)
- Max. depth: 18.7 meters (61 ft)
- Water volume: 14,890,000 cubic meters (526,000,000 cu ft)
- Shore length^{1}: 14,180 meters (46,520 ft)
- Surface elevation: 41.4 meters (136 ft)
- Islands: 5
- ^{1} Shore length is not a well-defined measure.

Lake Raku (Estonian: Raku järv or Kivijärv) is an artificial lake in Estonia. It is located partially in Tallinn and partially in the village of Männiku, between Männiku Road and the Viljandi highway.

== Physical description ==
The lake has an area of 219.8 hectares (543 acres), and it has five islands with a combined area of 0.8 hectares (2.0 acres). The lake has an average depth of 6.4 meters (21 ft) and a maximum depth of 18.7 meters (61 ft). It is 2,920 meters (9,580 ft) long, and its shoreline measures 14,180 meters (46,520 ft). It has a volume of 14,890,000 cubic meters (526,000,000 cu ft).

== See also ==
- List of lakes of Estonia
