= Jõune =

Village in Estonia

- Village
- Location within Estonia
- Coordinates: 58.669166666667°N 26.368055555556°E
- Country: Estonia
- County: Jõgeva County
- Parish: Jõgeva Parish
- Established: 1426 (or earlier)
- Time zone: UTC+2 (EET)
  - Summer (DST): UTC+3 (EEST)

Jõune is a village in Jõgeva Parish, Jõgeva County in Estonia.

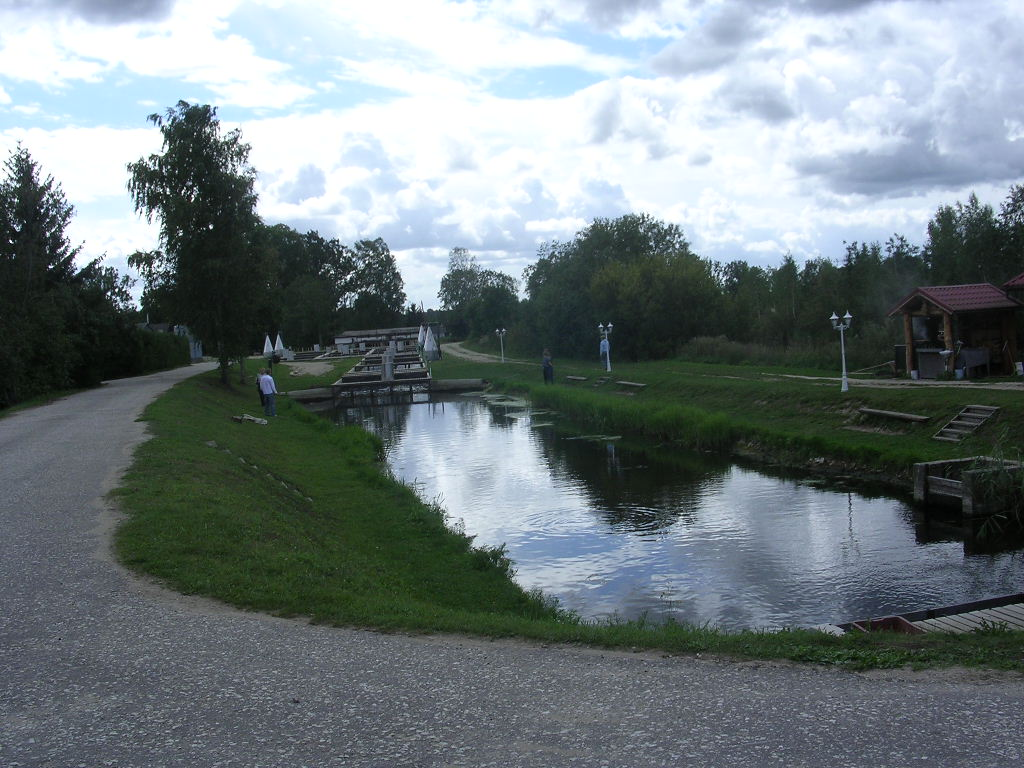
Härjanurme fish farm

Härjanurme fish farm is located in the village.
