= Kivijärvi (disambiguation) =

Kivijärvi is a municipality of Finland.

Kivijärvi ("Rock Lake"), a common name of lakes in Finland, may also refer to:

- Lake Kivijärvi (Central Finland)
- Lake Kivijärvi (South Karelia)
- Kivijärvi (surname)

== See also ==
- Kivijärv (disambiguation)
