= Kivijärvi (surname) =

Kivijärvi is a Finnish surname. Notable people with the surname include:

- Harry Kivijärvi (1931–2010), Finnish sculptor
- Kåre Kivijärvi (1938–1991), Norwegian photographer
