= Lake Kivijärvi (South Karelia) =

Lake in the country of Finland

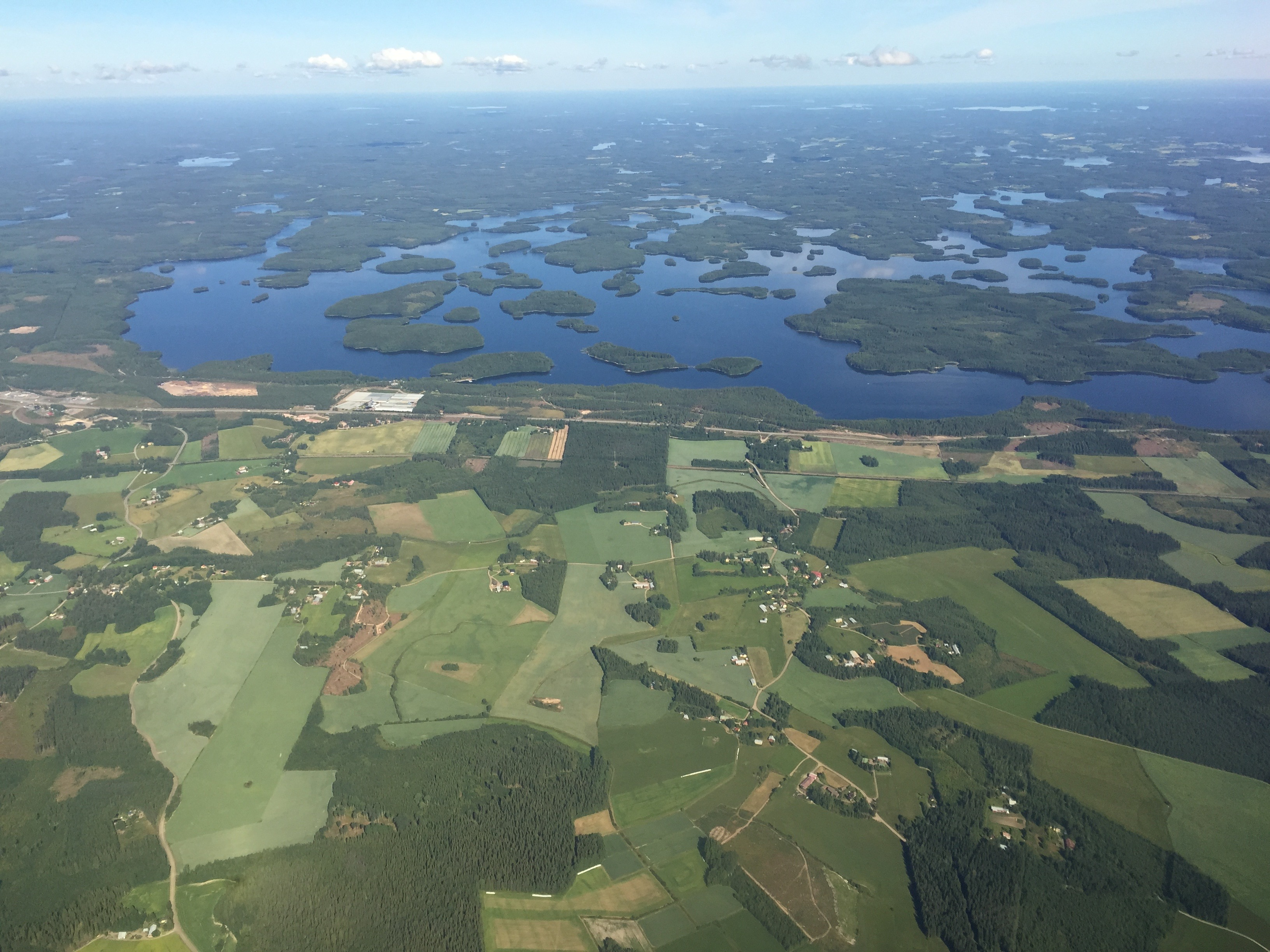

- Location within Finland
- Coordinates: 60.975°N 27.6734°E
- Lake type: Natural
- Catchment area: Kymijoki
- Basin countries: Finland
- Surface area: 76.365 km^{2} (29.485 sq mi)
- Average depth: 5.26 m (17.3 ft)
- Max. depth: 27 m (89 ft)
- Water volume: 0.402 km^{3} (0.096 cu mi)
- Shore length^{1}: 365.27 km (226.97 mi)
- Surface elevation: 75.2 m (247 ft)
- Frozen: December–April
- Islands: Haapasalo, Parkkisaari, Eteissaari, Muuraissaari
- Settlements: Luumäki
- ^{1} Shore length is not a well-defined measure.

Lake Kivijärvi is a medium-sized lake in South Karelia, Eastern Finland, with a total area of 76.4 square kilometres (29 sq mi). The name Kivijärvi is rather common name of the lake. In Finland there are 121 lakes with the same name. This one is the second biggest.

== See also ==
- List of lakes in Finland
