= Mustallika Nature Reserve =

Protected area in Estonia

- Location within Estonia
- Location: Estonia
- Coordinates: 58°43′N 26°26′E
- Area: 50 ha (120 acres)
- Established: 1992 (2005)

Mustallika Nature Reserve is a nature reserve which is located in Jõgeva County, Estonia.

The area of the nature reserve is 50 ha.

The protected area was founded in 1992 to protect Mustallika Bog.
