= Pangodi Landscape Conservation Area =

Protected area in Estonia

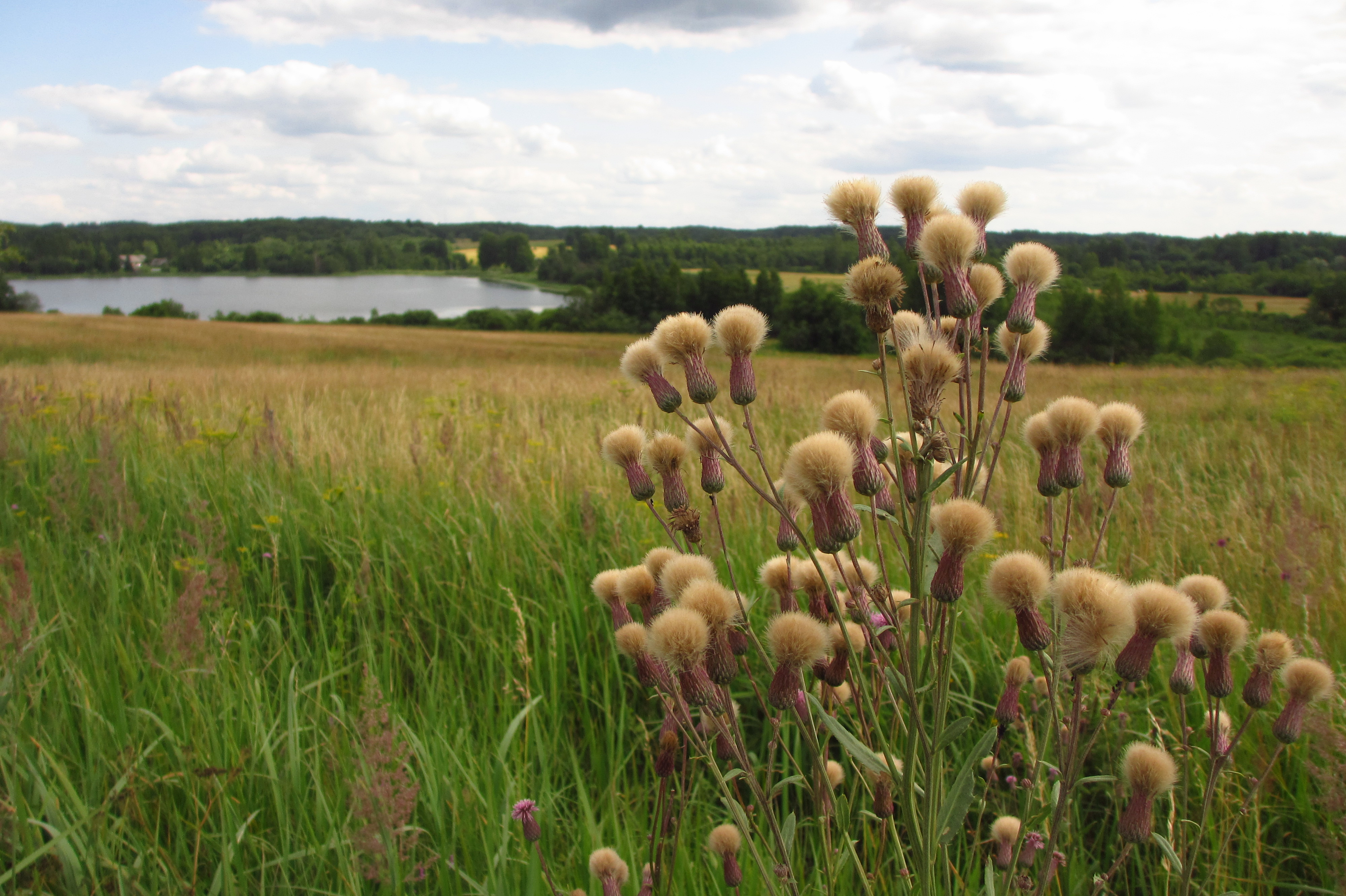

- Location within Estonia
- Location: Estonia
- Coordinates: 58°11′30″N 26°34′00″E
- Area: 383 ha (950 acres)
- Established: 1957 (2017)

Pangodi Landscape Conservation Area is a nature park which is located in Tartu County, Estonia.

The area of the nature park is 383 ha.

The protected area was founded in 1957 to protect Pikksaare Park and the Palumäed Hills near Lake Pangodi. In 1964, the borders were widened. In 2001, the protected area was designated a landscape conservation area.
