= Vooremaa Landscape Conservation Area =

Protected area in Estonia

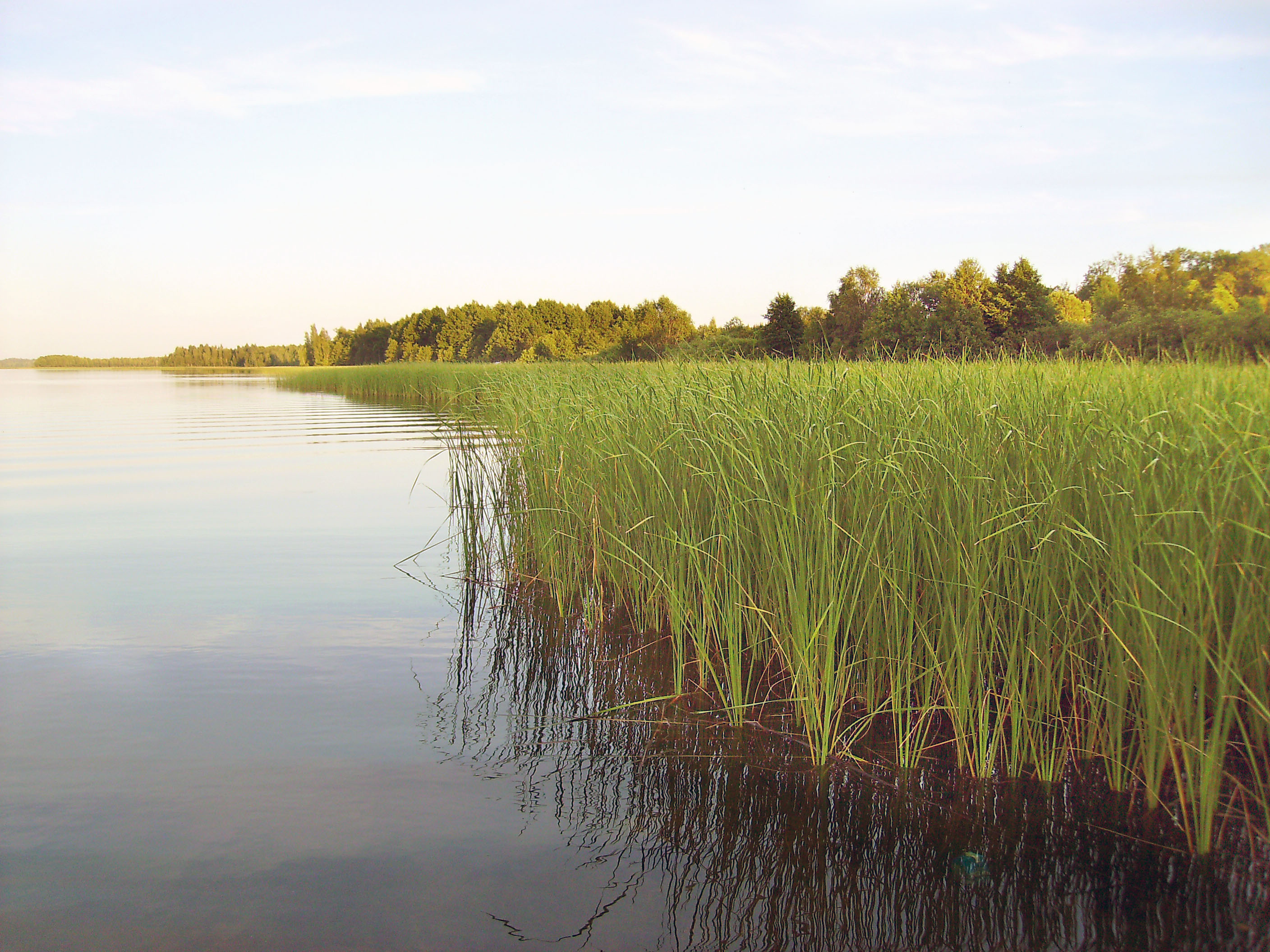

- Location within Estonia
- Location: Estonia
- Coordinates: 58°35′N 26°40′E
- Area: 9,882 ha (24,420 acres)
- Established: 2006

Vooremaa Landscape Conservation Area is a nature reserve situated in Tartu County, Estonia.

Its area is 9882 ha.

The protected area was designated in 2006 to protect the nature of Vooremaa.
