= Saduküla =

Village in Estonia

- Village
- Location within Estonia
- Coordinates: 58.6728°N 26.2894°E
- Country: Estonia
- County: Jõgeva County
- Parish: Jõgeva Parish
- Time zone: UTC+2 (EET)
  - Summer (DST): UTC+3 (EEST)

Saduküla (German: Saddoküll) is a village in Jõgeva Parish, Jõgeva County in Estonia.
