= Härjanurme, Jõgeva County =

Village in Estonia

- Village
- Location within Estonia
- Coordinates: 58.690555555556°N 26.348055555556°E
- Country: Estonia
- County: Jõgeva County
- Parish: Jõgeva Parish
- Time zone: UTC+2 (EET)
  - Summer (DST): UTC+3 (EEST)

Härjanurme (German: Herjanorm) is a village in Jõgeva Parish, Jõgeva County in Estonia.
