= Jõgeva Parish =

Municipality of Estonia

Coordinates: 58.813°N 26.292°E

Jõgeva Parish Jõgeva vald
- Municipality of Estonia
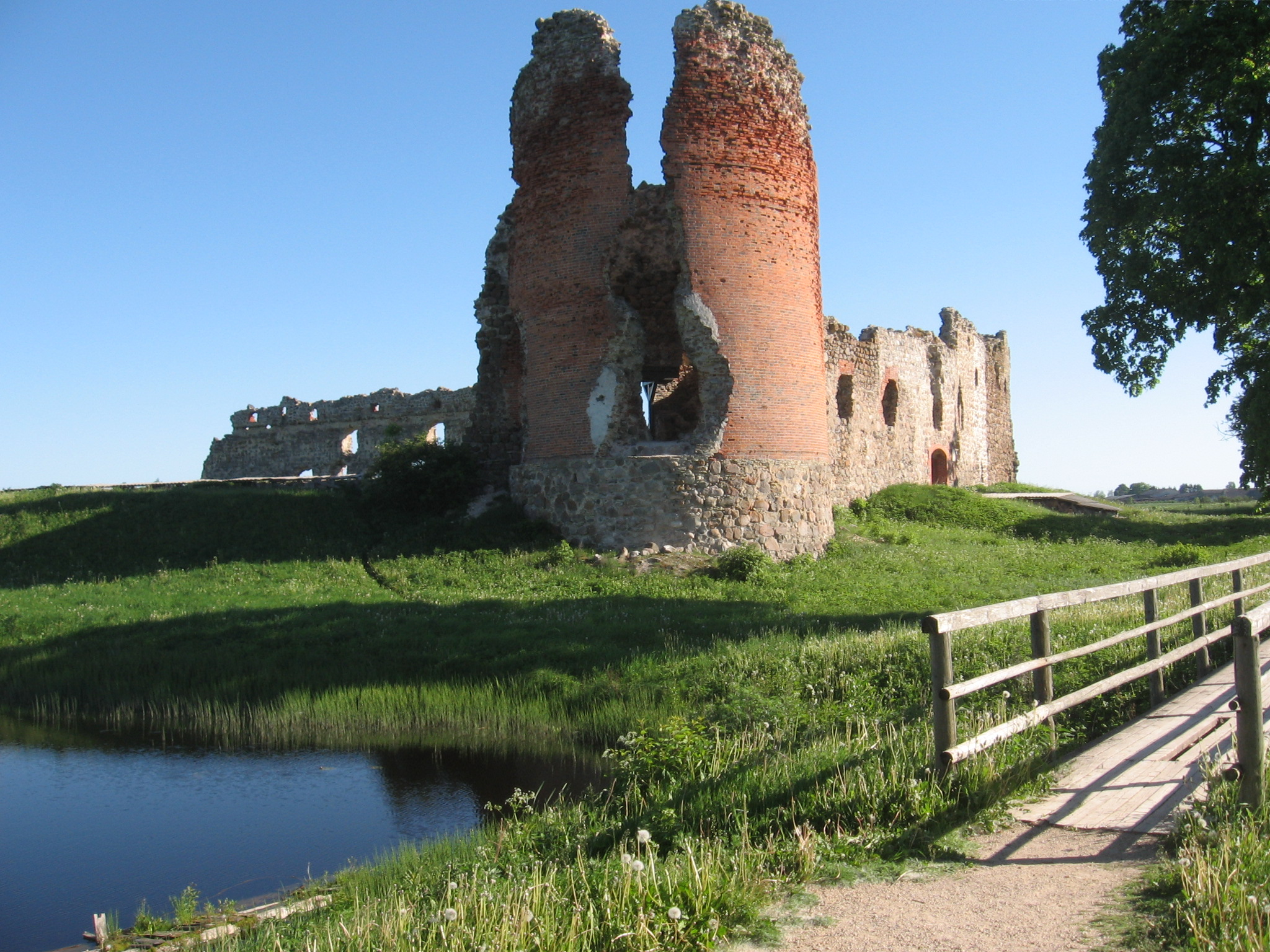
- Ruins of Laiuse Castle

- Flag Coat of arms

- Jõgeva Parish within Jõgeva County.
- Country: Estonia
- County: Jõgeva County
- Administrative centre: Jõgeva

Government
  - Parish Elder: Taavi Aas

Area
  - Total: 1,039.66 km^{2} (401.41 sq mi)

Population (2026)
  - Total: 12,641 ▼
  - Density: 12.159/km^{2} (31.491/sq mi)
- ISO 3166 code: EE-247
- Website: www.jogevavv.ee

Jõgeva Parish (Estonian: Jõgeva vald) is a rural municipality of Estonia, in Jõgeva County. It has a population of 12,849 (2025) and an area of 1,039.66 km^{2} (401.41 sq mi), with a population density of 12.36/km^{2}.

== Geography ==
Jõgeva Parish is located in central Estonia. It is bordered by the parishes of Tartu to the south, Põltsamaa and Järva to the west, Väike-Maarja and Vinni to the north, and Mustvee to the east.

The parish has a very diverse ecosystem. The landscape is largely defined by drumlins, the tallest of which, Laiuse, stands at 144 metres above sea level. The parish is home to two nature reserves, Endla and Mustallika, which are part of the Vooremaa Landscape Conservation Area, and the Natura 2000 network of nature protected areas.

The parish's largest rivers are Pedja, Amme, Kullavere and Laeva. The largest bodies of water are the Endla, Kuremaa, Pikkjärv, Prossa and Kivijärv lakes. It has natural resources such as peat, construction sand, gravel and flagstone.

== History ==
The Parish in its current form was created on 24 October 2017, as a result of administrative reform in Estonia. The former Jõgeva parish absorbed the parishes of Palamuse, Torma and Jõgeva town. The parish also absorbed the village of Kaave from the former Pärsti parish, as well as the villages of Jõune, Härjanurme, Päera and Saduküla from the former Puurmani parish.

== Insignia ==
Coat of arms: Azure, with a chief embattled argent, and a snowflake argent with six clover leaf-shaped points.

Flag: An azure field with a white snowflake, and a white pale embattled at the hoist.

The embattled elements represent the parish's Laiuse Castle, which was a key fortification in its time and protected the road to Russia from enemies. The snowflake represents Jõgeva's status as Estonia's "cold capital", where in 1940 the lowest temperature in the country was recorded at −43.5 °C (−46.3 °F). The snowflake's points are a reference to the clover leaf pattern which appears on the coat of arms for Jõgeva and the neighboring parishes of Palamuse and Torma. The azure colour represents the county's Vooremaa lakes.

The current insignia were created by artist Marju Pottisepp.

== Demographics ==
=== Population ===
As of 1 January 2026, the parish had 12,641 residents, of which 6,648 (52.6%) were women and 5,993 (47.4%) were men.

The parish's population had steadily decreased in recent years, by almost 1,500 between 2016 and 2026. This reflects a wider trend in Jõgeva County: in the same period, its population fell by almost 3,500. As a result of this, the proportion of older residents in the county has increased. The county's birth rate is low, and children up to and including 6 years old only make up 6% of the population. Statistics Estonia has predicted that these trends will continue. The shrinking local workforce has attracted foreign workers, who have faced problems with integration into Estonian society.

=== Religion ===
Among residents of the parish above 15 years of age, 9.2 per cent declared themselves to be Lutheran, 3.0 per cent to be Orthodox and Old Believers while other Christian denominations made up 1.3 per cent of the population. The majority of residents of the parish, 84 per cent, were religiously unaffiliated. 3.5 per cent of the population followed other religions or did not specify their religious affiliation.

== Politics ==
Composition of Jõgeva Parish Rural Municipality Council since 2021

The Rural Municipality Council of Jõgeva Parish has 27 Members:

- Independents: 5 Seats
- Estonian Centre Party: 6 Seats
- Estonian Reform Party: 5 seats
- Isamaa: 8 seats
- Conservative People's Party of Estonia: 3 seats

(As of the 2021 Estonian Municipal Elections)

== Education ==
As of 2018, there are 11 kindergartens in the parish, of which more than half were attached to a school. In total, 616 children were enrolled in kindergarten. As of the same year, the parish has 9 municipal comprehensive schools. Of particular note are Kiigemetsa school which caters to children with special educational needs, and the Luua forestry school which offers vocational education.

There are two specialised municipal schools in Jõgeva, one for music and one for art. In 2018, 178 students were enrolled at the musical school and 80 at the art school, which also offers 5-year courses for adults. In Palamüse there is a private musical studio, which offers singing, guitar, drums and piano classes.

== Medical and social servies ==
There are 10 general practitioners in the parish. The hospital in Jõgeva offers specialist and private medical services, health checkups, inpatient treatment and rehabilitation services. There is a dentist in Jõgeva and the villages of Palamüse and Torma, and the parish has 6 pharmacies.

Social services are provided by the Jõgeva social centre, the Elukaar social centre, the child centre Metsatareke in Siimusti and the Torma Parish social centre. There is social housing for low-income residents of the county in Kaarepere, Palamüse, Tõikvere, Torma, Kjarde and Jõgeva. The Vaimastere school runs a boarding programme for children from low-income and unstable families.

== Culture, leisure and sport ==
There are 11 libraries in the parish. The following institutions act as community centres: Vaiatu Community Centre, Sadala Community Centre, Torma Community Centre, Kuremaa Tourism and Development centre, Saduküla Community Centre, "Palamüse Kultuur" Community Centre, and Jõgeva community centre. The parish has three dance schools: JJ-Street, K-Tanstukool and Cestants, as well as a sports centre at the Kuremaa Experience Centre (Estonian: Kuremaa Elamuskeskus), where Volleyball and Swimming lessons take place. In the summer, student volunteering initiatives are organised; in 2020, these consisted of weeding at the Forestery School, assisting in the relocation of Torma village library, garden work, and cleaning at Kuremaa castle.

The municipal Youth Centre for Jõgeva parish opened on 1 February 2018, with the aim of creating a safe and friendly space to support youth identity and creativity, as well as helping young people find leisure activities and take part in social action. The institution has 9 regional branches. The parish elects a youth council, which helps clarify what young people think about life in the county, as well as implement youth interests at a municipal level and organise youth events and projects.

== Transport ==
As of 2018, there are 65 national roads which run through the parish, totalling 366 kilometres in distance. Of these, 186km are asphalt roads and 180km are gravel roads. A further 29 kilometres of local roads come under the parish's jurisdiction.

Estonia's national rail operator Elron operates four railway stations in the parish, in Vägeva, Pedja, Jõgeva and Kaarepere. Jõgeva station is served by 12 trains a day, by services between Tallinn or Tapa and Tartu, Valga and Koidula.

== Notable people ==
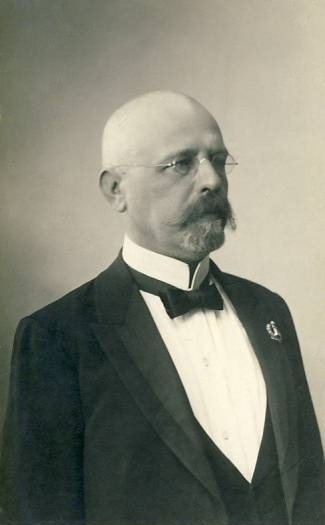
Jaan Poska

- Georg von Oettingen (1824 in Visusti – 1916), a Baltic German physician and ophthalmologist.
- Alexander von Oettingen (1827 in Visusti – 1905), a Baltic German, Lutheran theologian and statistician.
- Arthur von Oettingen (1836 in Luua – 1920), a Baltic German physicist and music theorist.
- Jaan Poska (1866 in Laiusevälja – 1920), lawyer, politician, Mayor of Tallinn, 1913–1917 and Minister of Foreign Affairs, 1918–1919.
- Aleksander Tõnisson (1875 in Pööra – 1941), Major General, mayor of Tartu, 1934–1939 and Lord Mayor of Tallinn, 1939 to 1940.
- Oskar Luts (1887 in Järvepera – 1953), writer and playwright.
- Edgar Krahn (1894 in Laiuse – 1961), a Baltic German mathematician
- Theodor Luts (1896 in Palamuse – 1980), film director and cinematographer
- Elise Käer-Kingisepp (1901 in Laiuse – 1989), physician, pharmacologist, physiologist and sports medicine specialist.
- Paul Ariste (1905 in Rääbise – 1990), linguist, studied Finno-Ugric languages, and an Esperantist
- Aleksander Illi (1912 in Vaimastvere – 2000), basketball player, competed in the 1936 Summer Olympics
- Virve Aruoja (1922 in Saduküla – 2013), TV and film director and former actress.
- Sulev Vahtre (1926 in Laiuse – 2007), an eminent historian.
- Ago Roo (born 1946 in Visusti), stage, TV, voice and film actor
- Ingrid Isotamm (born 1979 in Palamuse), stage, film, radio and TV actress.

== See also ==
- Laiuse Castle
- Endla Nature Reserve
- Lake Endla
