= Torma Parish =

Former municipality of Estonia

Coordinates: 58.813°N 26.738°E

Torma Parish Torma vald
- Former municipality of Estonia
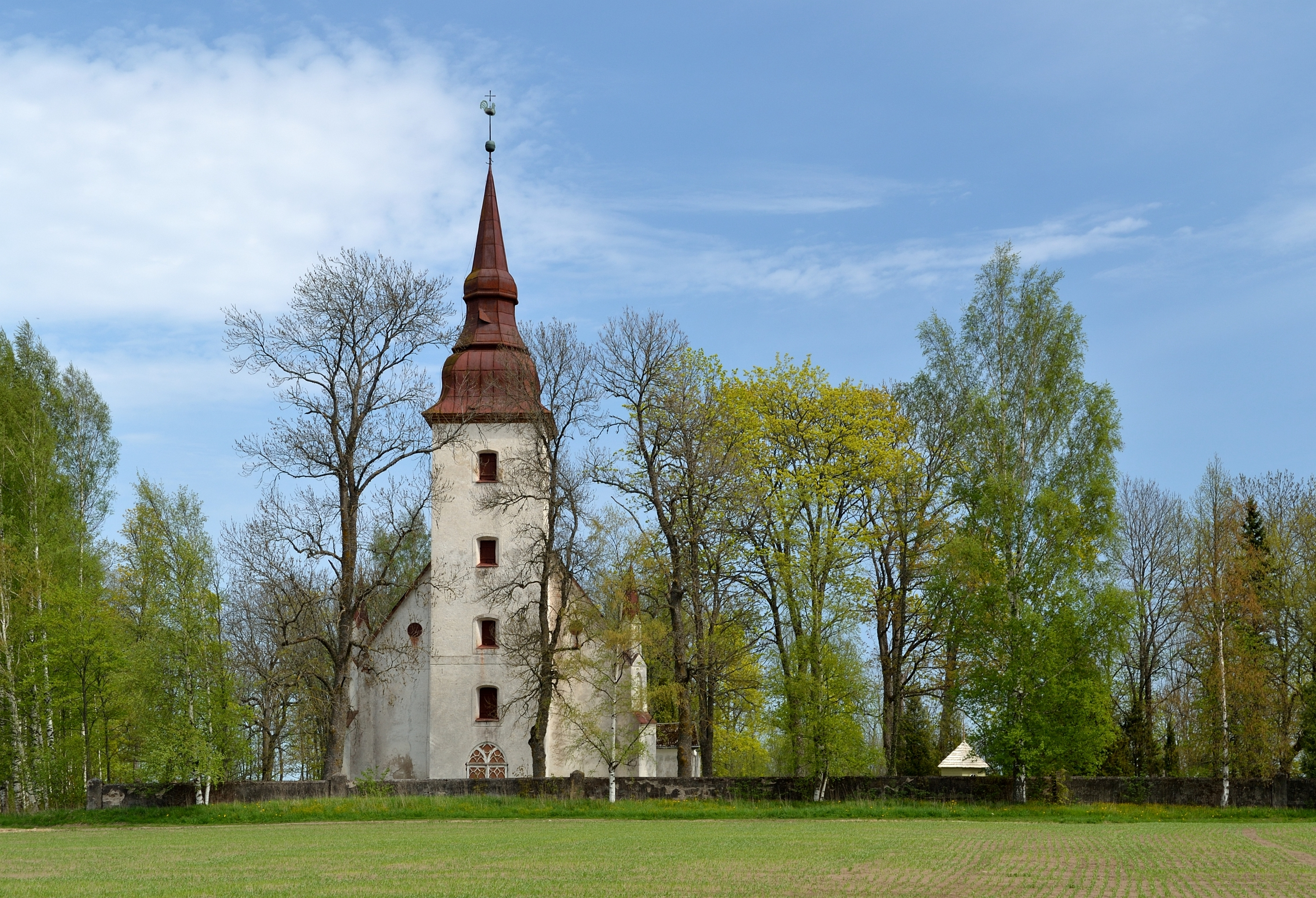
- Torma church

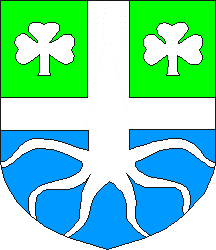
- Flag Coat of arms

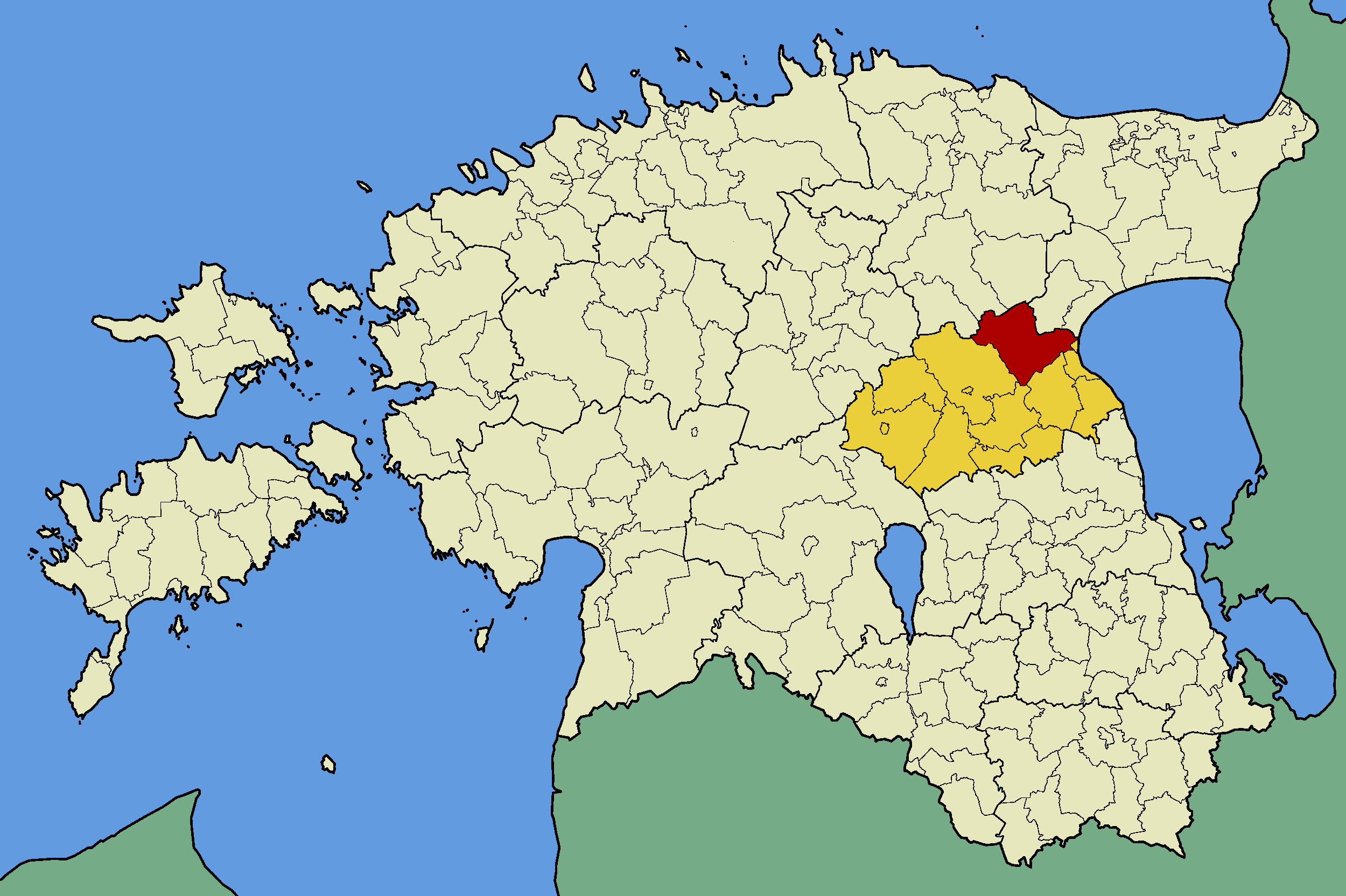
- Torma Parish within Jõgeva County.
- Country: Estonia
- County: Jõgeva County
- Administrative centre: Torma

Area
  - Total: 349.3 km^{2} (134.9 sq mi)

Population (2006)
  - Total: 2,472
  - Density: 7.077/km^{2} (18.33/sq mi)
- Website: www.torma.ee

Torma Parish (Estonian: Torma vald) was a rural municipality of Estonia, in Jõgeva County. It had a population of 2,472 (2006) and an area of 349.3 km². As a result of the 2017 Estonian administrative reforms, it was incorporated into Jõgeva Parish.

== Populated places ==
Torma Parish had 2 small boroughs and 24 villages.

Small boroughs

Torma - Sadala

Villages

Iravere - Kantküla - Kodismaa - Koimula - Kõnnu - Leedi - Liikatku - Lilastvere - Näduvere - Ookatku - Oti - Rääbise - Rassiku - Reastvere - Sätsuvere - Tähkvere - Tealama - Tuimõisa - Tõikvere - Vaiatu - Vanamõisa - Võidivere - Võtikvere
