= Võtikvere Nature Reserve =

Protected area in Estonia

- Location within Estonia
- Location: Estonia
- Coordinates: 58°52′30″N 26°49′30″E
- Area: 117 ha (290 acres)
- Established: 2005

Võtikvere Nature Reserve is a nature reserve which is located in Jõgeva County, Estonia.

The area of the nature reserve is 117 ha.

The protected area was founded in 2005 to protect valuable type of habitats and threatened species in Võtikvere village (Torma Parish).
