= Tellise Nature Reserve =

Protected area in Estonia

- Location within Estonia
- Location: Estonia
- Coordinates: 58°50′N 26°53′E
- Area: 238 ha (590 acres)
- Established: 2005

Tellise Nature Reserve is a nature reserve which is located in Jõgeva County, Estonia.

The area of the nature reserve is 238 ha.

The protected area was founded in 2005 to protect valuable habitat types and threatened species in Võtikvere village (former Torma Parish).
