= Kõnnu =

Kõnnu may refer to several places in Estonia:

- Kõnnu, Harju County, village in Kuusalu Parish, Harju County
- Kõnnu, Jõgeva County, village in Jõgeva Parish, Jõgeva County
- Kõnnu, Pärnu County, village in Põhja-Pärnumaa Parish, Pärnu County
- Kõnnu, Põlva County, village in Räpina Parish, Põlva County
- Kõnnu, Saaremaa Parish, village in Saaremaa Parish, Saare County
- Kõnnu, Tartu County, village in Kastre Parish, Tartu County
- Püha-Kõnnu, village in Saaremaa Parish, Saare County, formerly known as Kõnnu when located in Pihtla Parish
