= Baltic War =

The term Baltic War or Baltic Wars may refer to:

- any of the wars involving the Baltic states:
  - List of wars involving Estonia
  - List of wars involving Latvia
  - List of wars involving Lithuania
- specifically, any part of the Soviet or Nazi military involvement in the area of the Baltic states:
  - Soviet westward offensive of 1918–1919
    - Estonian War of Independence
    - Latvian War of Independence
    - Lithuanian–Soviet War
  - Baltic offensive
  - Soviet re-occupation of the Baltic states (1944)
- it can also refer to 1634: The Baltic War, a part of the alternate history 1632 book series
