= List of wars involving Estonia =

Below is a list of military conflicts in which Estonians participated on a larger scale or took place on Estonian territory. Items in bold are the wars most often considered to be major conflicts by Estonian historians and the general public.

== Pre-Christian Estonia ==
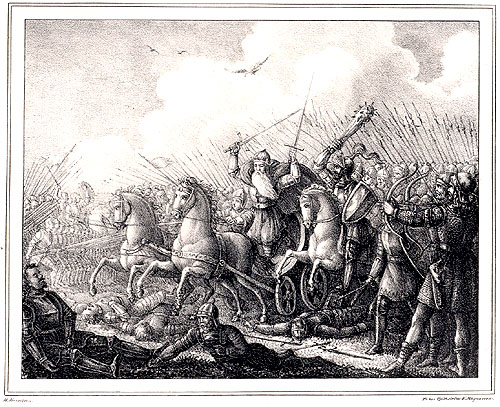
Battle of Brávellir in Sweden

- 6th century – 1203, a series of Estonian (mostly Oeselian) raids and counter-raids against the Swedish, Danish, Norwegian and Icelandic vikings as well as by their later states:
  - 6th century, Gotland Viking attempt to colonize Hiiumaa Island;
  - 7th century, attempted Swedish invasion of Estonia by King Ingvar Harra;
  - 7th century, Swedish raid on Estonia by King Anund;
  - 8th century, Battle of Brávellir, on the side of the Swedes, against the Danes;
  - Finnish names during the Rus campaigns and DNA evidence suggest Estonian warriors and 2 Finnic leaders took part in Rus'–Byzantine War (907)
  - Revolts under Olof Skötkonung

Swedish dominion over the Baltic weakened

  - 972, a battle against Icelandic Vikings on Saaremaa Island;
  - 1008, a battle against Norwegian Vikings on Saaremaa Island;
  - 11th century, a Swedish Viking raid to Viru County;
  - 1170, a naval battle between Estonians, its allies and Denmark near Öland Island;
  - 1187, Estonians (or Karelians or Curonians) raid of Mälaren and Sigtuna in Sweden;
  - 1203, Estonian raid on Danish Scania;
    - 1203, a naval battle between Estonians and German settlers of Riga near Visby, Gotland.
- 1030–1217, a series of battles and (raid) campaigns against Kievan Rus', Novgorod, Pskov and Smolensk:
  - 1030, Kievan Rus' defeat Chuds and establish Yuryev stronghold;
  - 1032, according to one hypothesis, battle at Iron Gate mentioned in Russian chronicles and usually placed in northern Russia, may have been naval battle, where Novgorod fleet was defeated near Aegna;
  - ca. 1054, Kievan Rus' campaign against Estonians;
  - 1060, Kievan Rus' campaign against Sosols (tribe possibly in Estonia) and taxation of them.
  - 1061, Sosols uprise, destroy Yuryev and attack Pskov.
  - 1077, Smolensk and Novgorod campaign against Chuds (possibly Estonians);
  - 1113, a battle against Kievan Rus', possibly in modern Izborsk;
  - 1116, Kievan Rus' conquest of Otepää stronghold;
  - 1130, Kievan Rus' campaign against Estonians;
  - 1132, a battle against Novgorod in Vaiga County;
  - 1134, a battle against Novgorod for Tarbatu (Yuryev) stronghold;
  - 1177, Estonian raid of Pskov;
  - 1180, Novgorod raid of Southeastern Estonia;
  - 1190, Pskov attack on Estonian sailors on Lake Peipus;
  - 1192, Novgorod raid of Tarbatu (Yuryev) stronghold;
  - 1192, Novgorod raid of Otepää stronghold.
  - 1210–1227, raids during the Livonian Crusade:
    - 1210, Pskov's and Novgorod's raid of Ugandi and Torma and siege of Otepää stronghold;
    - 1211, Pskov raid to Western Estonia;
    - 1211, Novgorod raid to Viru County;
    - 1212, Novgorod and Pskov raid to Central Estonia;
    - 1212, Estonian raid of Pskov;
    - 1216, Pskov conquest of Otepää stronghold;
    - 1221, Novgorod raid of Ugandi;
    - 1223, a general Pskov and Novgorod raid to mainland Estonia;
- 1213–1219, Lithuanian raids against Estonians;
  - 1213, Lithuanian raid to Sakala County;
  - 1219, Lithuanian raid to Saaremaa Island and mainland Estonia;

== Crusades and Catholic states ==
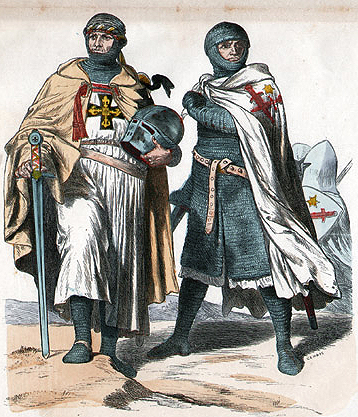
Livonian Brothers of the Sword of the early 13th century

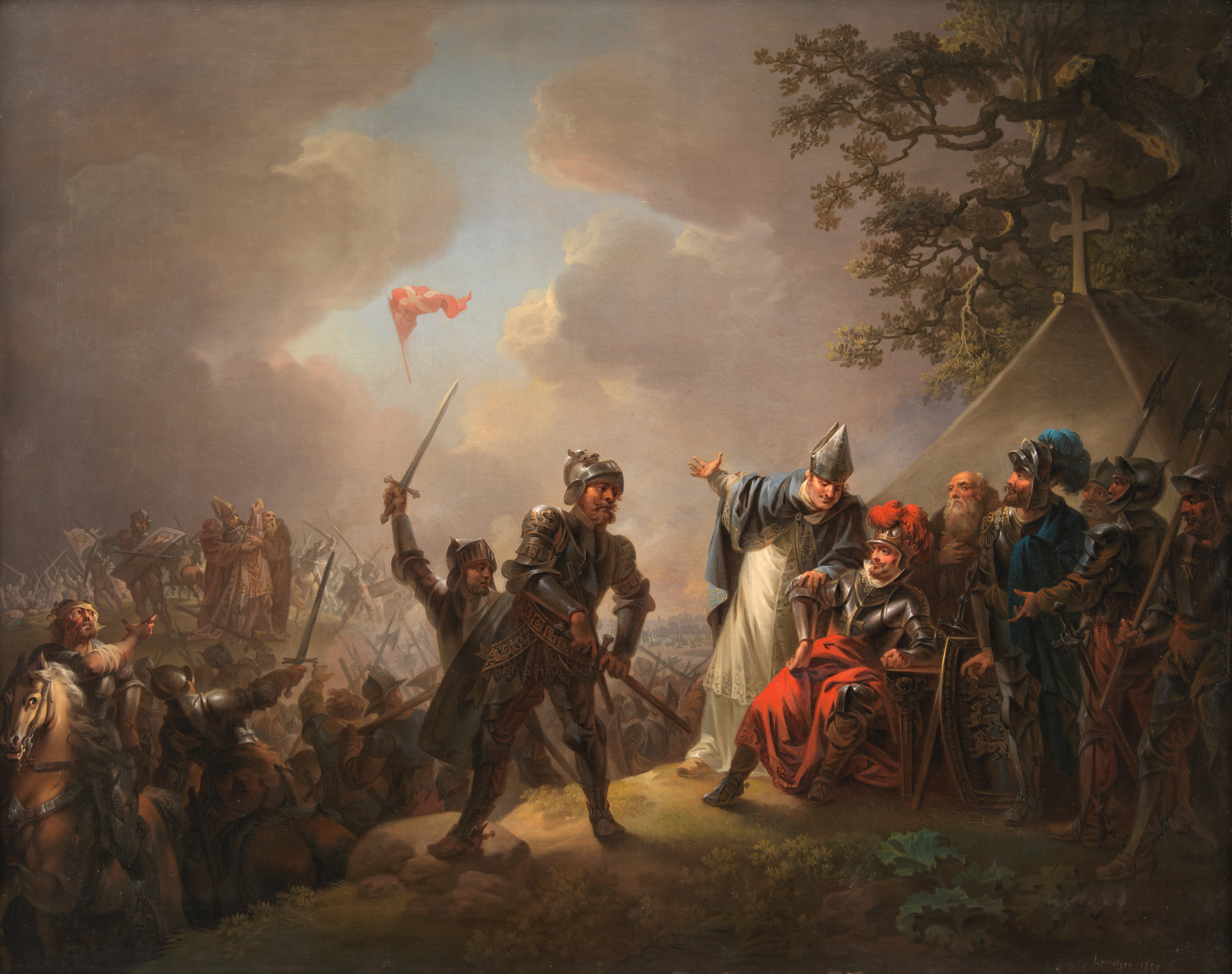
Battle of Lindanise during the Danish-led Campaign of the Livonian Crusade

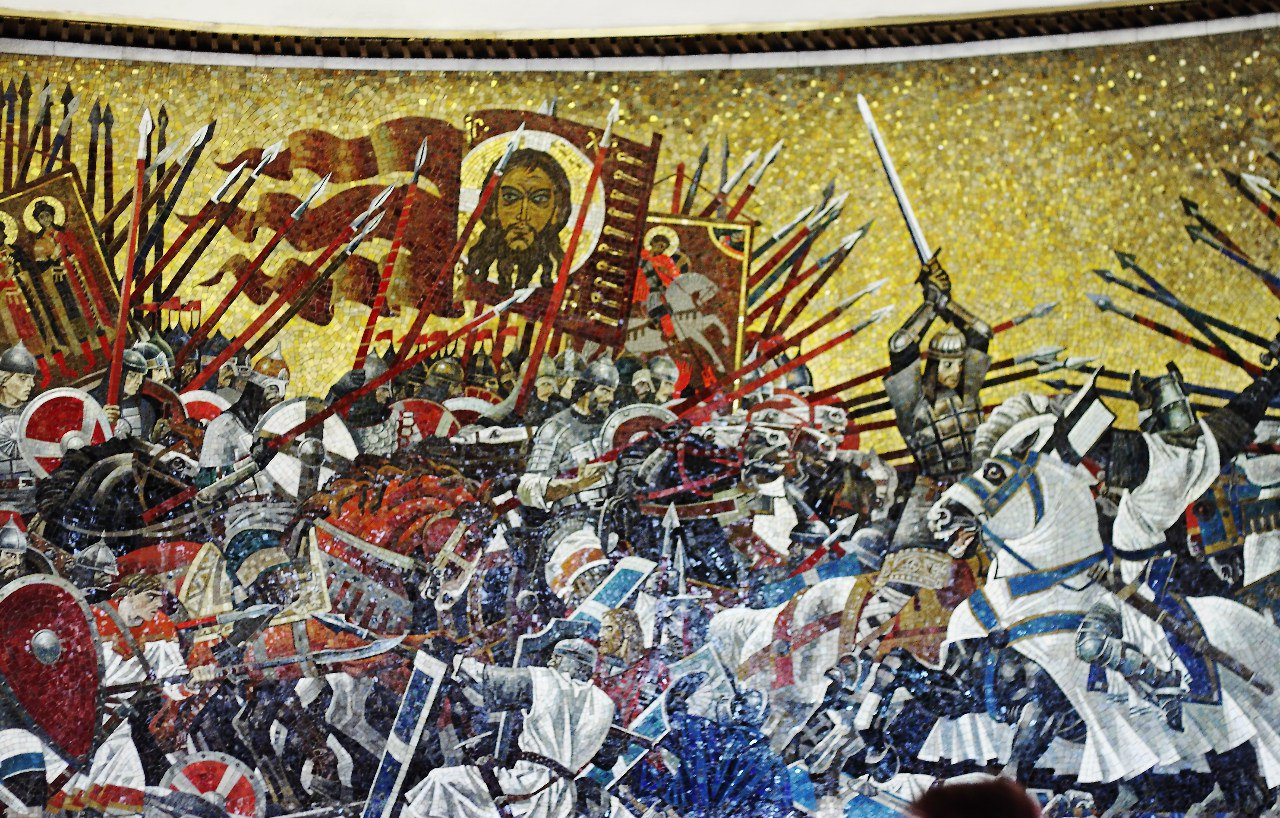
Battle of the Ice in 1242

Map of Medieval Livonia in 1260

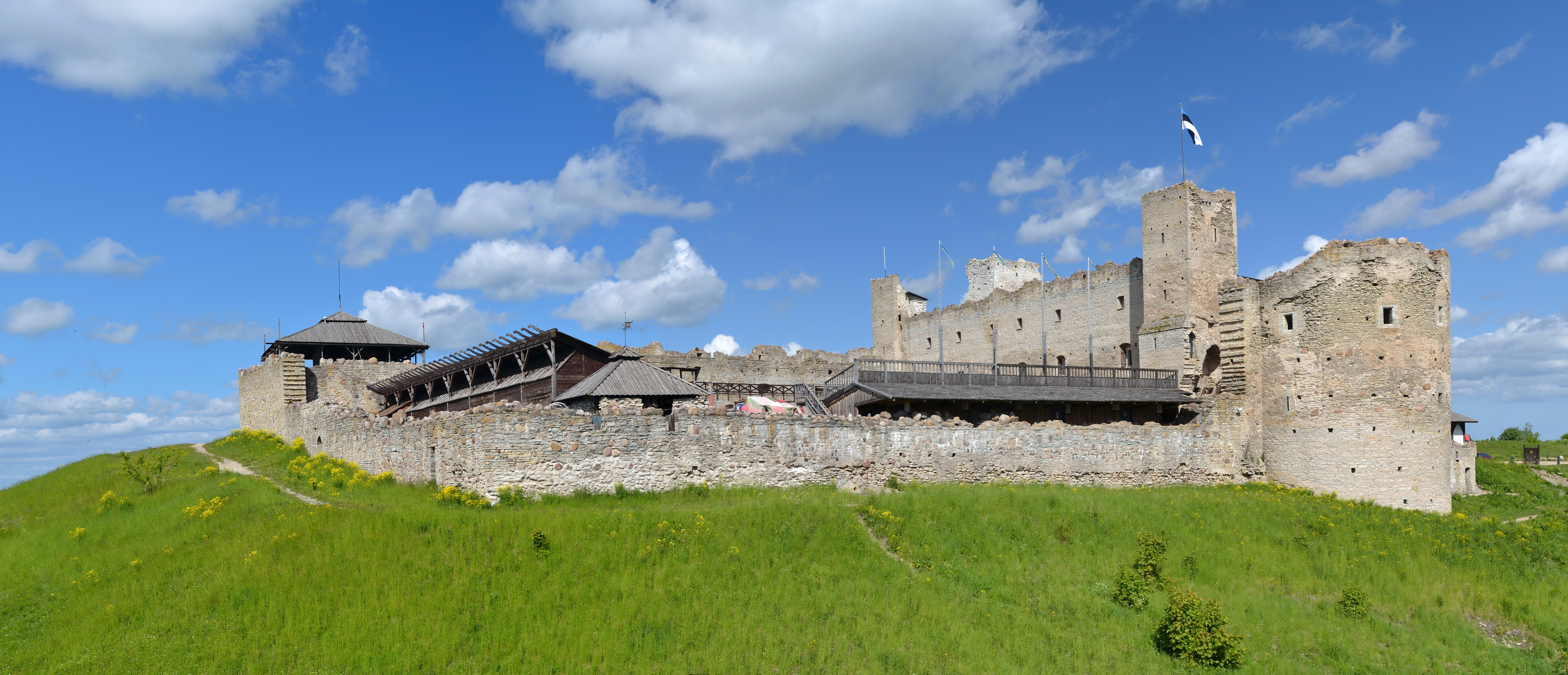
Ruins of Rakvere (Wesenberg) Castle

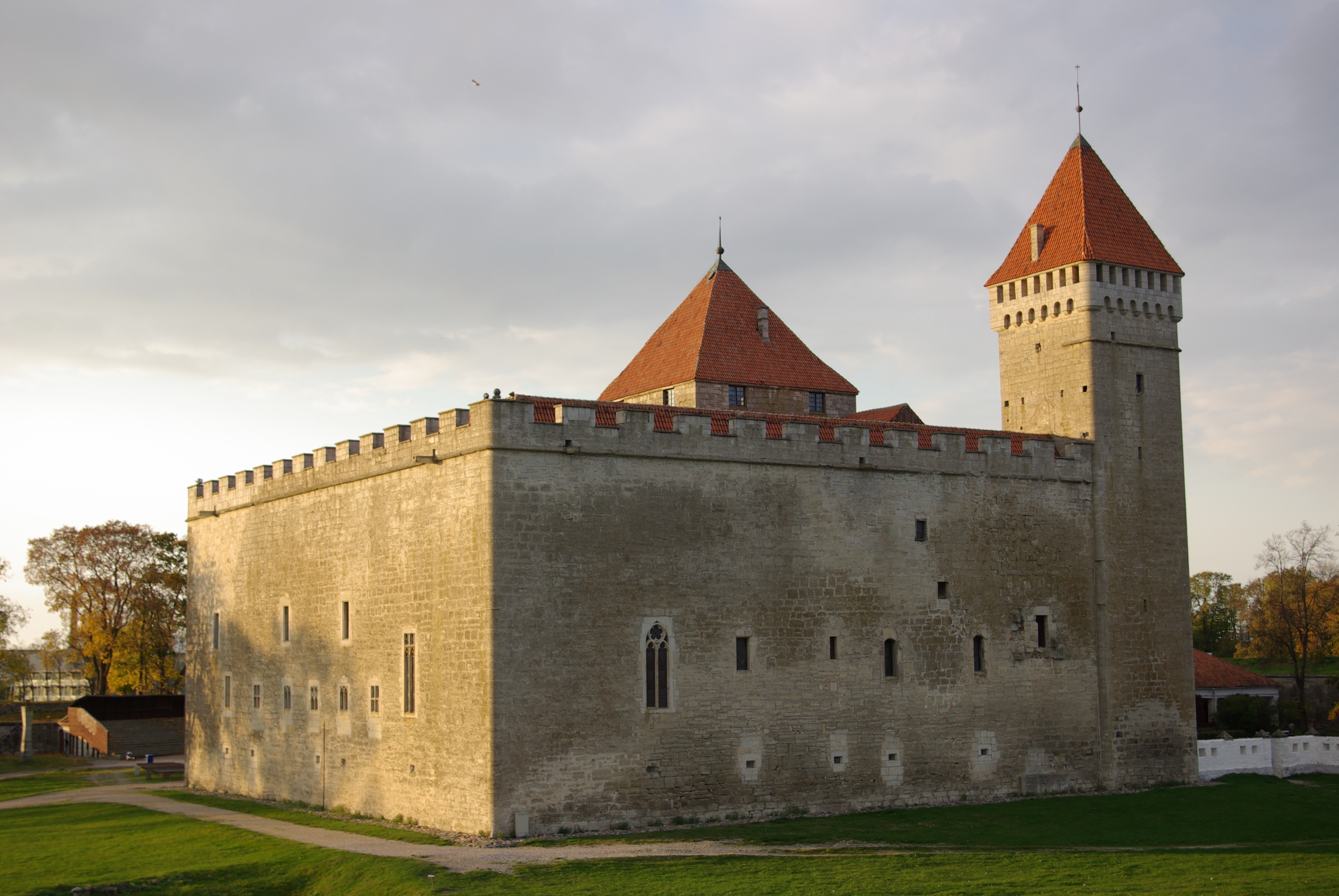
Kuressaare Castle

Estonia remained one of the last corners of medieval Europe to be Christianized. In 1193 Pope Celestine III called for a crusade against pagans in Northern Europe. The Northern Crusades from Northern Germany established the stronghold of Riga. With the help of the newly converted local tribes of Livs and Letts, the crusaders initiated raids into part of what is present-day Estonia from 1197.

- 1197–1268, Northern Crusades (1147–13th century/16th century):
  - 1197, a Swedish, Gutnish as well as German crusader and possibly Danish raid to Viru County;
  - 1206–1261, the Livonian Crusade (1198–1290):
    - 1206, 1st Danish attempt to conquer Saaremaa Island, but possibly to Lindanise at Revala County instead;
    - 1208, a possible Danish raid to Viljandi in Sakala County;
    - 1208–1227, Livonian Brothers of the Sword and allied **Conquest of Estonia**;
      - 1210–1224, Estonian counter campaigns against the Livonian Brothers of the Sword;
      - 1217–1223, occasional Estonian-allied Pskov's and Novgorod's battles against the crusaders;
      - 1219–1224, **Danish Conquest of Northern Estonia**, aided by Rügen and Nordalbingia;
      - 1220, Battle of Lihula, against Sweden;
      - 1222, 2nd Danish attempt to conquer Saaremaa Island;
    - 1219/1225–1238, a conflict between Denmark and the Livonian Brothers of the Sword, later the Livonian Order;
    - 1236–1261, Saaremaa Rebellions:
      - 1236–1241, 1st Rebellion of Saaremaa;
      - ca. 1241–ca. 1255, a possible rebellion on Saaremaa;
      - 1260–1261, 2nd Rebellion of Saaremaa;
  - 1217–1268, crusader and allied Estonian conflicts with Pskov and Novgorod:
    - 1217, Livonian Brothers of the Sword and allied raid around Pskov and Novgorod;
    - 1233, Livonian Brothers of the Sword conquest of Izborsk and Pskov;
    - 1233, Reconquest of Izborsk and Pskov from the Livonian Brothers of the Sword by the forces of Novgorod and Pskov;
    - 1234, Pskov and Novgorod invasion of the Bishopric of Dorpat;
    - 1240–1242, Livonian campaign against Rus';
    - 1253, Livonian Order raid of Pskov;
    - 1253, Pskov, Novgorod and Karelian raid of Northeastern Estonia;
    - 1254, Novgorod and Karelian raid to Northeastern Estonia;
    - 1254, Bishopric of Riga's and Danish raid to Votia and Karelia;
    - 1255, Novgorod raid to Northeastern Estonia;
    - 1256, united crusader, Danish, Swedish and Finnish failed attempt to conquer Ingria from Novgorod;
    - 1262, Novgorod raid of Tartu (Dorpat);
    - 1262, Novgorod's and Polotsk's raid of Tartu (Dorpat);
    - 1267, Novgorod raid of Rakvere (Wesenberg);
    - 1268, Novgorod raid of Northern Estonia and Battle of Rakvere, against the Livonian Order;
- 1233–1557, a series of civil wars on the Estonian part of Medieval Livonia, between different crusader states:
  - 1233, Livonian Order's reconquest of Tallinn (Reval) from papal legate Balduin de Alna;
  - 1238, Livonian Order's and Bishopric of Ösel-Wiek's conquest of Koluvere Castle from the de Lode family;
  - 1297–1330, war between the Livonian Order and the alliance of the Archbishopric of Riga and the town of Riga;
  - 1298, a border war between the Livonian Order and the Bishopric of Ösel-Wiek;
  - 1374–1397, Incorporation Strife, between the Bishopric of Dorpat and the Livonian Order;
  - 1396, Bishop Damerow's Conflict, between the Livonian Order and the Bishopric of Dorpat;
  - 1423–1468, Ösel-Wiek Strifes, within the Bishopric of Ösel-Wiek;
  - 1479, Stodewescher Feud, between the Livonian Order and the Archbishopric of Riga;
  - 1481–1491, war between the Livonian Order and the alliance of the Archbishopric of Riga and the town of Riga
  - 1532–1536, Ösel-Wiek Feud, within the Bishopric of Ösel-Wiek;
  - 1556–1557, Coadjutor Feud, between the Livonian Order and the alliance of the Archbishopric of Riga;
- 1236–1329, conflict between the crusaders and Lithuanian involving Estonian units or taking place in the Estonian part of Medieval Livonia:
  - 1236, Battle of Saule, involving Estonian units;
  - 1263, Lithuanian raid of Old-Pärnu;
  - 1270, Lithuanian raid to Saaremaa and the Battle of Karuse, against the crusader states;
  - 1298, Lithuanian raid to Southern Estonia;
  - 1322, Lithuanian raid of the Bishopric of Dorpat;
  - 1323, Lithuanian raid of Northern Estonia;
  - 1329, Lithuanian raid to Southern Estonia
- 1269–1343, post-crusade period conflicts between the crusader and Russian states:
  - 1269, Livonian Order's raid of Izborsk and Pskov;
  - 1294, Livonian Order's failed attempt to conquer Votia;
  - 1294, Novgorod raid of Narva;
  - 1299, Livonian Order's raid of Pskov;
  - 1307, Livonian Order's raid of Pskov;
  - 1323, Livonian Order's raid of Pskov;
  - 1341–1343, war between the Livonian Order and Pskov;
  - 1349, Livonian Order's raid around Pskov;
  - 1367, Novgorod raid of Narva and Northeastern Estonia;
  - 1367, Novgorod raid of Vastseliina;
  - 1369, Russian raid of Southeastern Estonia;
  - 1371, Pskov's and Novgorod's raid of Southern Estonia;
  - 1406, Pskov raid of Southern Estonia;
  - 1407, Pskov raid of Eastern Estonia;
  - 1443–1448, war between the Livonian Order and Novgorod;
  - 1480–1481, war between the Livonian Order and Pskov;
  - 1501–1503, Livonian-Muscovite War;
- 1343–1345, the **St. George's Night Uprising** against Denmark and the Livonian Order.

== Kingdom of Sweden ==
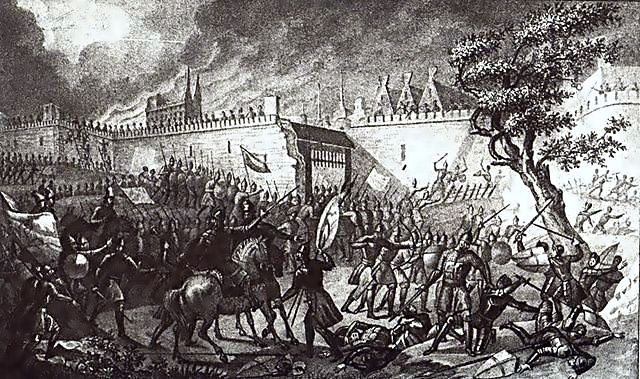
Siege of Narva in 1558

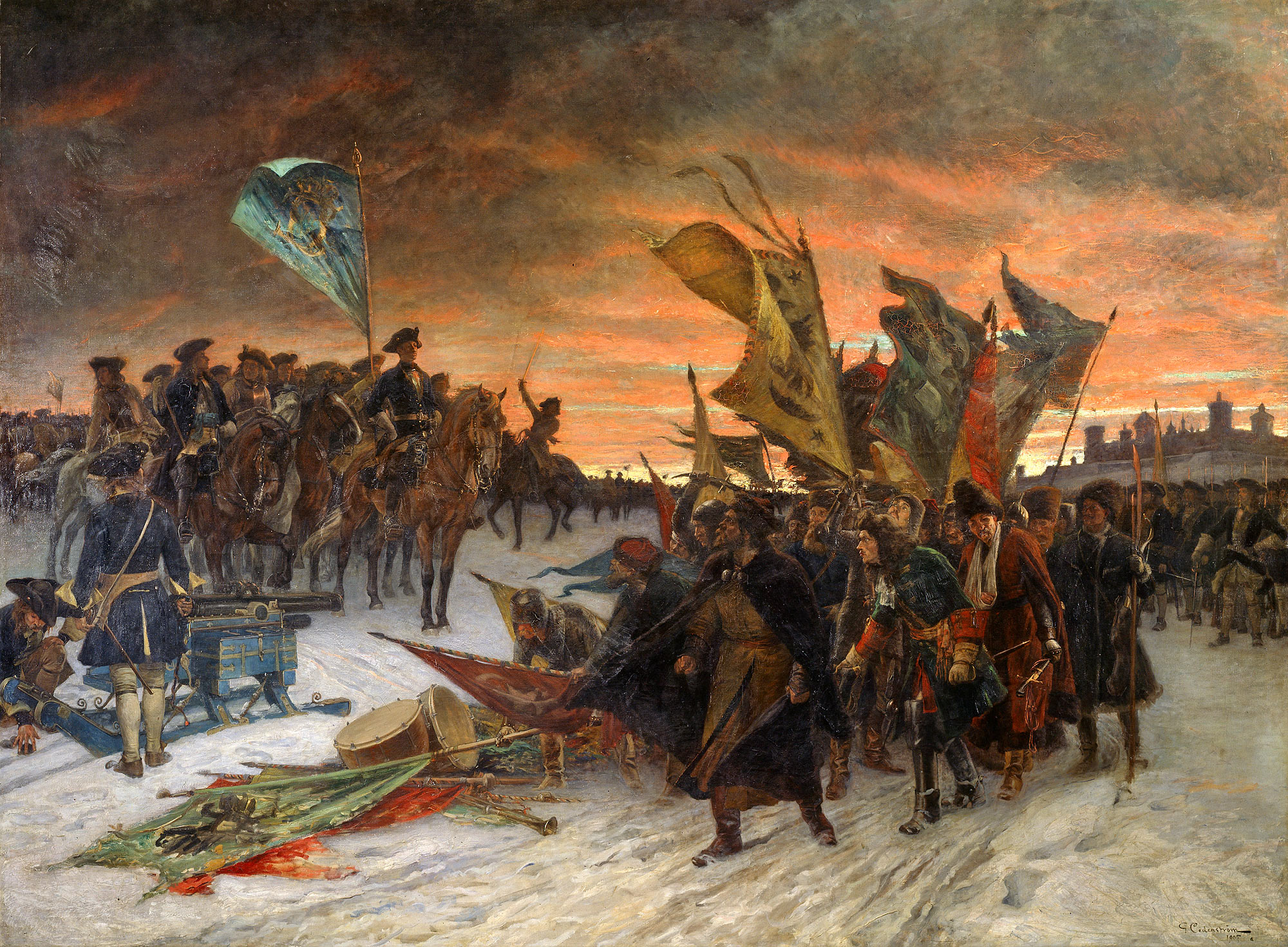
Battle of Narva in 1700

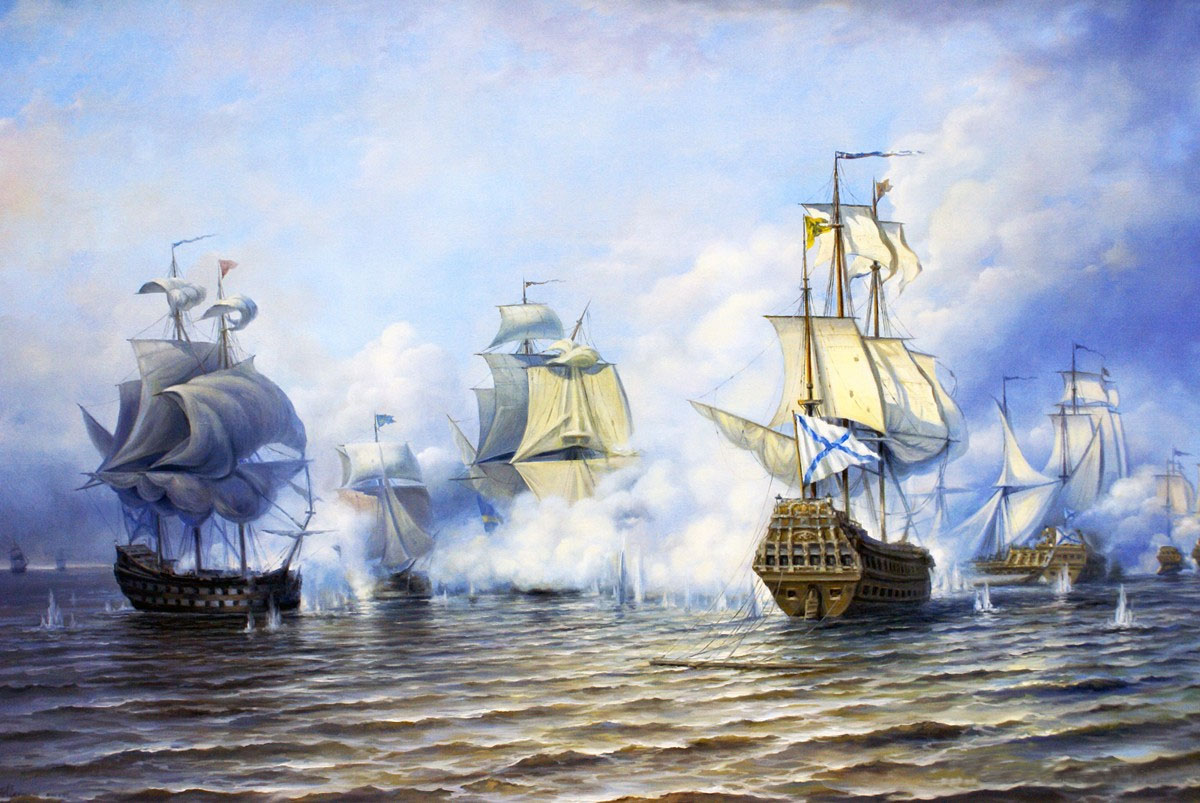
Battle of Ösel Island in 1719

By the late 1550s, the Reformation and Counter-Reformation had caused internal conflicts in Livonian Confederation, while its Eastern neighbour Russia had grown stronger after defeating the khanates of Kazan and Astrakhan. The conflict between Russia and the Western powers was exacerbated by Russia's isolation from sea trade. Neither could the tsar hire qualified labour in Europe.

- 1558–1583, the **Livonian War**, between Russia and an alliance of the Livonia, Poland–Lithuania, Denmark-Norway and Sweden;
  - 1558–1561, Russo-Livonian War;
  - 1560/1570–1577, Duke Magnus of Holstein's campaign in Central Estonia, allied with Russia;
  - 1560, Wiek peasant uprising;
  - 1562–1570, Muscovite–Lithuanian War;
  - 1563–1570, Northern Seven Years' War between Sweden and an alliance of Denmark-Norway, Poland–Lithuania and Lübeck;
  - 1570, Klaus Kursell's rebellion against the administration of Swedish Estonia;
  - 1570–1583, Russo-Swedish War;
  - 1575–1582, Russo-Polish War;
  - 1577–1579, Ivo Schenkenberg's raids against Russia;
- 1590–1595, Russo-Swedish War of 1590–1595;
- 1600–1625, the Polish–Swedish War (1600–1629):
  - 1600–1611, the war of 1600–1611;
  - 1617–1618, the war of 1617–1618;
  - 1621–1625, the war of 1621–1625;
- 1611–1613, the Kalmar War (1611–1613)
- 1613, Time of Troubles (1598–1613):
  - 1613, Ingrian War (1610–1617), Russian raids into Swedish Estonia;
- 1642, Pühajõgi Revolt
- 1656–1657, the Second Northern War (1655–1660) between Poland-Lithuania, Russia and their allies on one side and Sweden and its allies on the other side;
  - 1656–1658, Russo-Swedish War (1656–1658);
  - 1657–1658, Polish-Swedish War (1655–1660).
- 1700–1710, the **Great Northern War (1700–1721)**, between Swedish alliance and Russian alliance;
  - 1711–1712, unsuccessful Swedish landings in Estonia;
  - 1719, Battle of Ösel Island.

== Russian Empire (1721–1917) ==
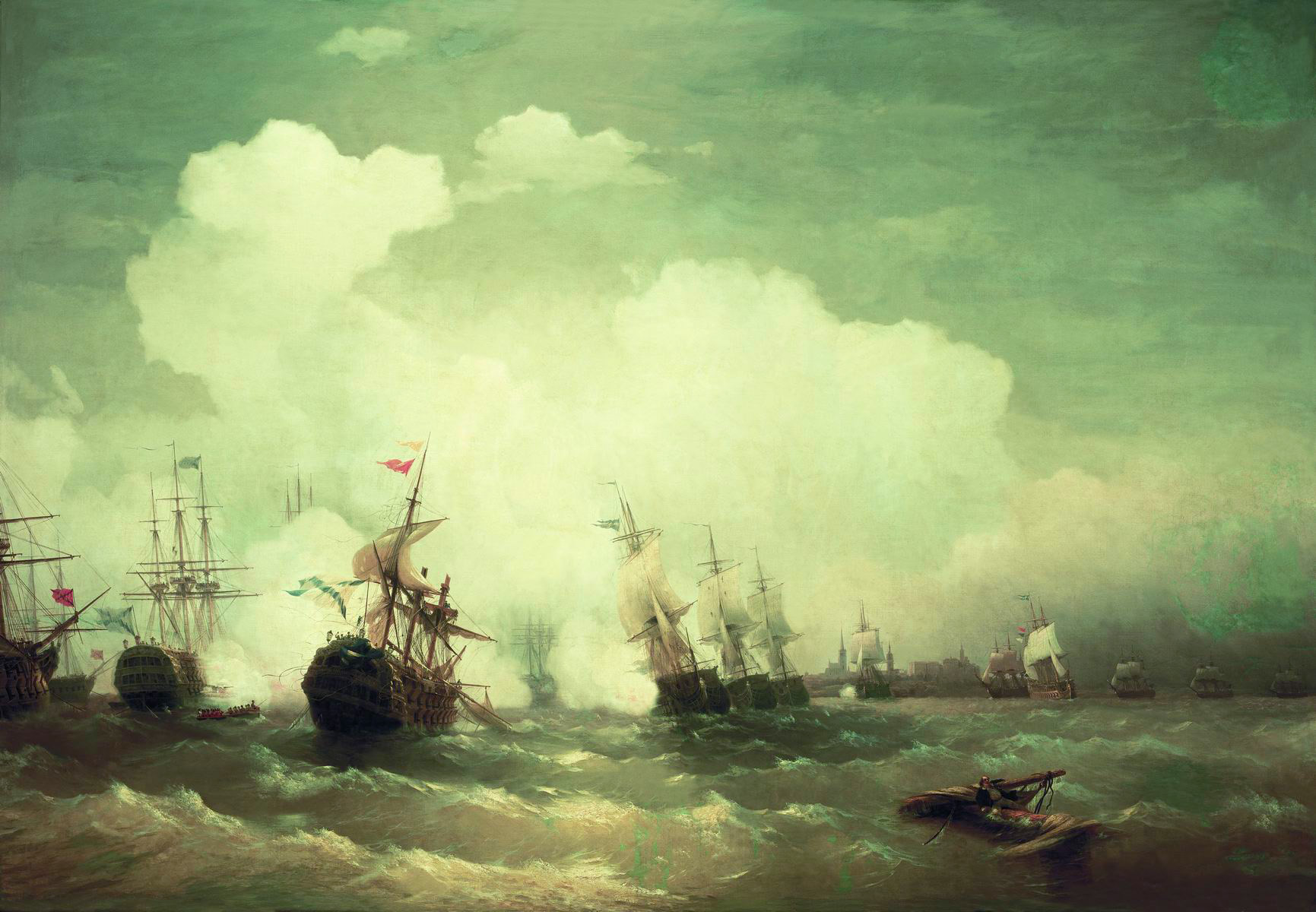
Battle of Reval in 1790

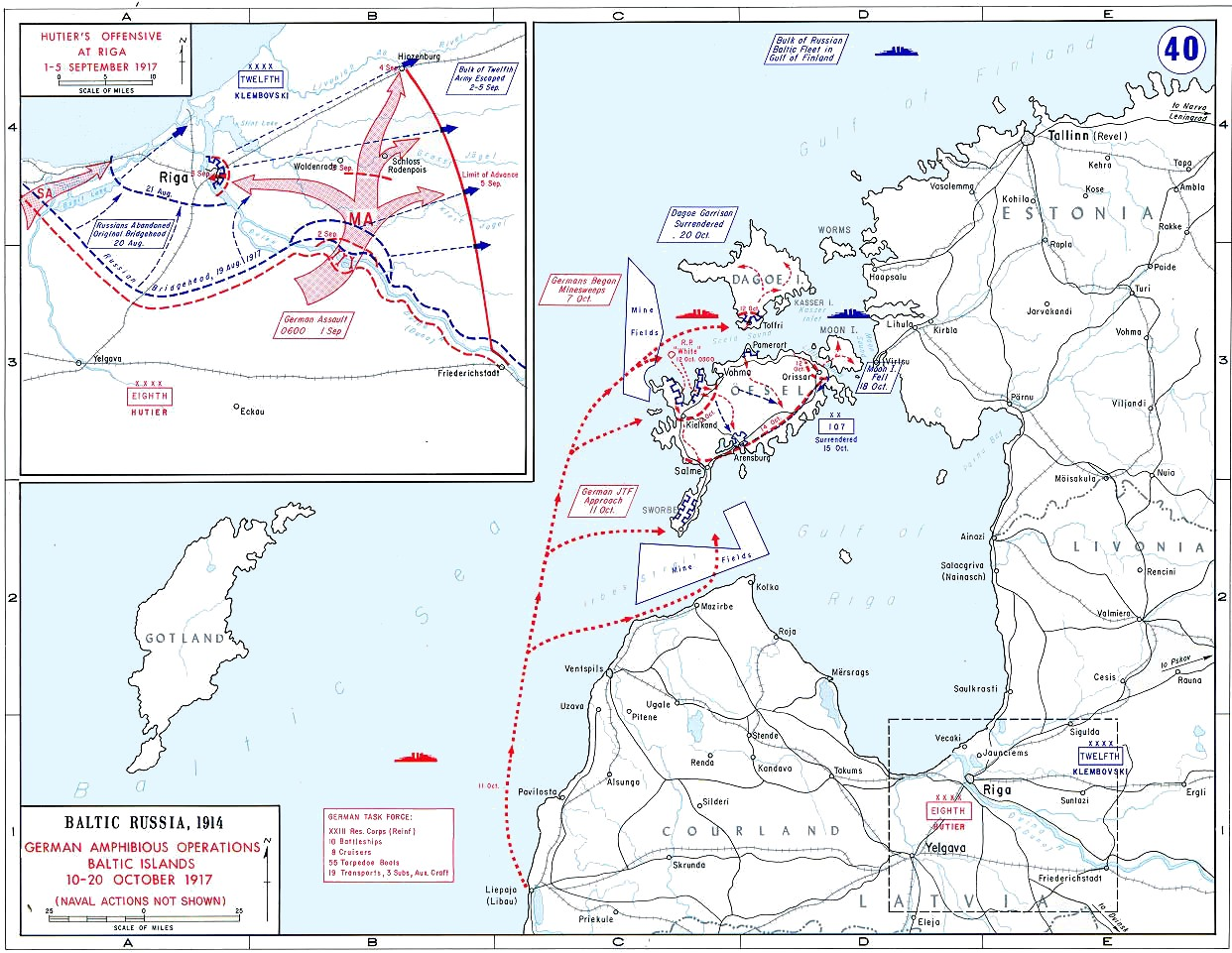
Map of Operation Albion of 1917

After the Great Northern War, the territory of Estonia was officially handed over to the Russian Empire in 1721. Conflicts that occurred in Estonia during that era:

- 1784, Baltic Head Tax Riots:
  - 1784, "Wooden Fence War", between Estonian peasants and the Russian Army;
- 1790, Russo-Swedish War (1788–90):
  - 1790, Battle of Reval;
- 1805, "Kose-Uuemõisa War", between Estonian peasants and the Russian Army;
- 1808–1809, Finnish War:
  - 1808–1809, Paldiski Naval Blockade, by Sweden and the United Kingdom;
- 1841, "Pühajärv War", between Estonian peasants and the Russian Army;
- 1854–1855, Crimean War (1853–1856):
  - 1854–1855, Baltic Sea Campaign: British and French naval attacks on Estonian coastal settlements and occasional landings.
- 1858, "Mahtra War", between Estonian peasants and the Russian Army;
- 1905–1906, the **Russian Revolution of 1905** between local revolutionaries and the Russian Army;
- 1914–1918 World War I:
  - 1914–1918, a series of naval battles during the Baltic Sea Campaign;
  - 1915, German attack of Ruhnu Island;
  - 1916, German attack of Paldiski;
  - 1917, **Operation Albion**, between German Empire and the retreating Russian Republic;
  - 1918, **Operation Faustschlag**, between German Empire and the retreating Russian Republic;
- 1917, Russian Revolution:
  - 1917, February Revolution:
    - 1917, **March Revolution**, between local revolutionaries and the Russian Army;
  - 1917, **October Revolution**, between Bolshevik revolutionaries and Estonian officials.

Soldiers were conscripted among Estonians since 1796. At first, the term of service was 25 years, but was lowered to 20 years plus 5 years of reserve in 1834 and to 12 years plus 3 years of reserve in 1855. Estonians served in several wars involving the Russian Empire:

- 1904–1905, Russo-Japanese War, against Japan;
- 1914–1918, **World War I**, against the Central Powers;
  - 1915–1918, among the Russian Expeditionary Force in France.

== Independent Estonia (1918–1940) ==
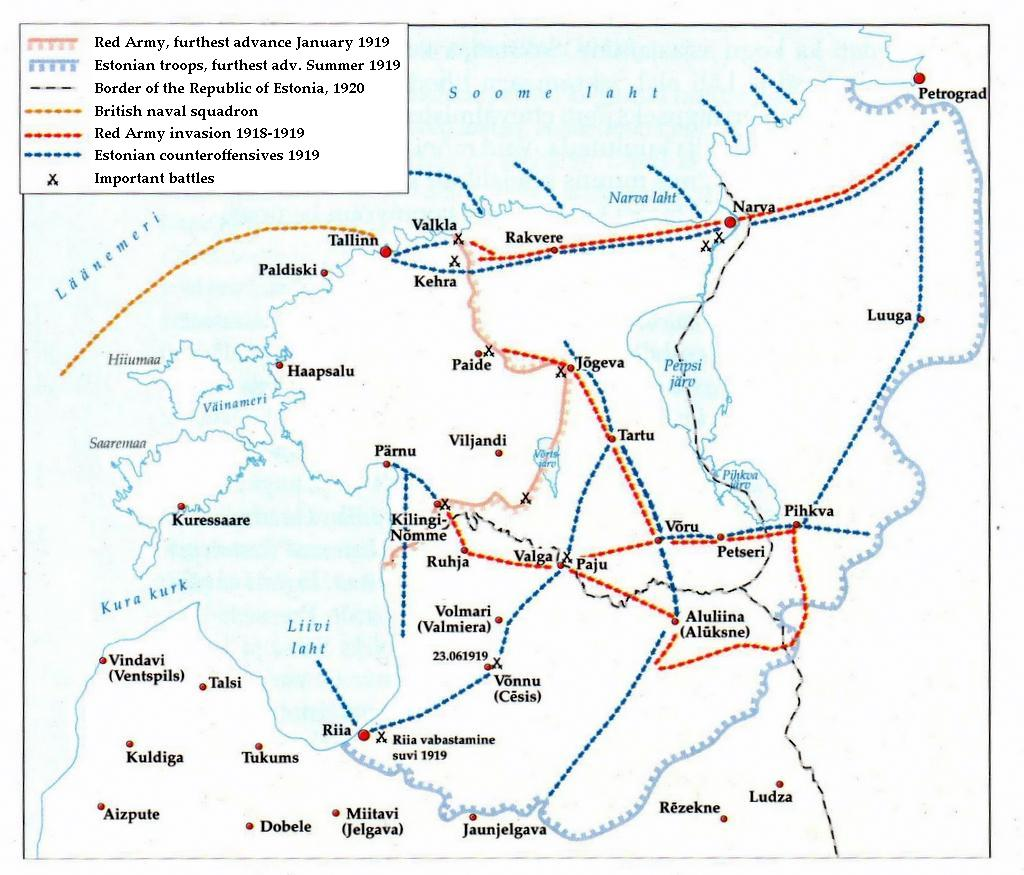
Map of the Estonian War of Independence of 1918–1920

Estonia declared independence on 24 February 1918. After a brief German occupation in World War I, Estonia regained independence and was subsequently invaded by the Red Army. A series of conflicts followed:

- 1918–1920, Russian Civil War (1917–1922);
  - 1918–1920, the **Estonian War of Independence**
    - 1918–1920, war between Estonia and the Russian SFSR;
    - 1918–1919, British campaign in the Baltic;
    - 1918, the Battle of Punapargi, against retreating German soldiers of World War I;
    - 1919, a failed rebellion in Saaremaa;
    - 1919, White Army's and Estonian Petrograd campaign;
    - 1919, the Latvian War of Independence, in alliance with Latvia against both German and Soviet Russian forces;
      - 1919, the **Landeswehr War**, against the Baltische Landeswehr.

Estonians also took part of the Estonian War of independence on the Soviet Russian side. They formed the puppet state Commune of the Working People of Estonia (1918–1919) in an effort to show the conflict as an Estonian civil war.

Other conflicts with Estonian volunteers:

- 1918, the Finnish Civil War, mostly on the side of whites against the reds and Soviet Russia.
- 1917–1922, the Russian Civil War, mostly on the side of the Bolsheviks, and mostly following their defeat in the Estonian War of Independence.

Other conflicts of the time:

- 1924, the 1924 Communist coup d'état attempt;
- 1936, Estonian forces open fire on three Soviet airplanes above Narva;
- 1938, a firefight with Soviet Border Guards on Lake Peipus.

== World War II ==
Estonia declared its neutrality in 1938, but was forced to allow Soviet military bases on its territory in 1939 and was occupied and annexed by the Soviet Union in 1940. World War II brought a number of sub-conflicts:

- 1940–1944, World War II (1939–1945):
  - 1940, the Soviet occupation of Estonia;
    - 1940, a shootout between soldiers of the Estonian Signal Battalion and the Red Army;
  - 1941, the **Summer War**, between Germany and the Soviet Union;
    - 1941, "Estonian Forest Brothers" guerrilla war against the Soviet Union;
  - 1941–1944, Bombing raids in Estonia by the Soviet Union and the Luftwaffe;
    - Bombing of Narva
    - Bombing of Tallinn
  - 1944, the Soviet re-occupation of Estonia:
    - 1944, the Soviet **offensive in Estonia**;
    - 1944, the Estonian attempt to restore independence.

Estonians fought on both the German and the Soviet side in the war, in all major battles involving Estonia. Other sub-conflicts of World War II with Estonian volunteers:

- 1939–1940, the Winter War on the Finnish side and against the Soviet Union.
- 1941–1944, the Continuation War on the Finnish side and against the Soviet Union.

== Soviet occupation (1944–1991) ==
After the Soviet recapture of Estonia, many Estonians went into hiding and waged a low intensity resistance to the Soviet regime:

- 1944–1957/1978, Estonian "**Forest Brothers**" **guerrilla war against the Soviet Union**.

During the Soviet occupation, many Estonians were conscripted to the Soviet Armed Forces and were recruited to fight in several wars involving the Soviet Union:

- 1944–1957/1978, against the "Forest Brothers" guerrilla war in Soviet-occupied Baltic states;
- 1950–1953, in the Korean War against the United Nations and allied forces;
- 1956, in the Hungarian Revolution of 1956 against Hungarian revolutionaries;
- 1968, in the Warsaw Pact invasion of Czechoslovakia against Czechoslovakia and its allies;
- 1979–1989, the Soviet–Afghan War, against the Sunni Mujahideen.

At the same time, many émigré Estonians also fought for Western nations, most notably for the United States, Canada, Australia and for the United Kingdom.

- 1950–1953, in the Korean War against North Korea and its allies, including the Soviet Union;
- 1964–1973, in the Vietnam War against the communist forces, including the Soviet Union.

== Independent Estonia (1991–onwards) ==
Estonia joined the North Atlantic Treaty Organization (NATO) in 2004, and has taken part of the following conflicts:

- 2003–2014/2021, the War on terror (2001–2021):
  - Conflicts:
    - 2003–2009, the Iraq War (2003–2011) as part of the Multi-National Force – Iraq (MNF–I);
    - 2003–2014, the War in Afghanistan (2001–2021) as part of the International Security Assistance Force (ISAF).
  - Peacekeeping missions:
    - 2013, as part of the Operation Active Endeavour (OAE) (2001–2021) in the Mediterranean Sea.

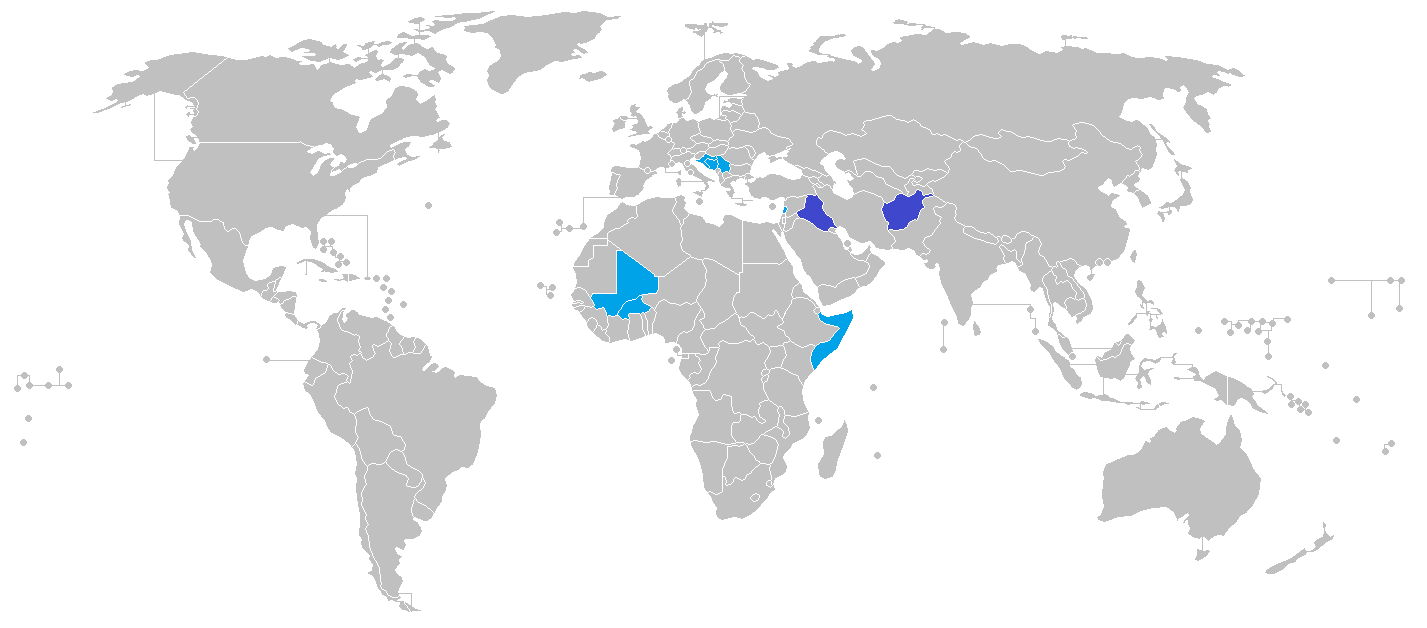
List of conflicts involving Estonia since 1991

Estonia has also taken part in several peacekeeping missions:

- 1995, as part of the United Nations Protection Force (UNPROFOR) (1992–1995) in Croatia;
- 1996–1997 and 2015–onwards, as part of the United Nations Interim Force in Lebanon (UNIFIL) (1978–present).
- 1996–2011, in Bosnia & Herzegovina:
  - 1996, as part of the Implementation Force (IFOR) (1995–1996);
  - 1996–2004, as part of the Stabilization Force (SFOR);
  - 2004–2011, as part of the European Union Force Althea (EUFOR Althea) (2004–present);
- 1999–2018, as part of the Kosovo Force (KFOR);
- 2010–2013, as part of the Operation Atalanta (EU-NAVFOR-ATALANTA) (2008–present) in Somalia;
- 2014, in the Central African Republic Civil War(2012–present) as part of the European Union Force RCA (EUFOR RCA) (2014–2015);
- 2018–2022, in the Mali War (2012–present) as part of Operation Barkhane (2014–2022) and Takuba Task Force (2020–2022).
- 2024, in the Red Sea crisis through participating in Operation Aspides with one soldier.

Other conflicts:

- 2025–present, spillover of the Russo-Ukrainian war (2022–present).

== See also ==
- History of Estonia
- List of wars
- Military history of Estonia
- List of wars involving Russia
- List of wars involving Latvia
