= Kantküla =

Kantküla may refer to several places in Estonia:

- Kantküla, Harju County, village in Kose Parish, Harju County
- Kantküla, Jõgeva County, village in Jõgeva Parish, Jõgeva County
- Kantküla, Lääne-Viru County, village in Vinni Parish, Lääne-Viru County

== See also ==
- Kandiküla, village in Tartu urban municipality, Tartu County
