= Kivimurru Nature Reserve =

Protected area in Estonia

- Location within Estonia
- Location: Estonia
- Coordinates: 58°52′N 26°55′E
- Area: 55 ha (140 acres)
- Established: 1968 (2013)

Kivimurru Nature Reserve is a nature reserve which is located in Jõgeva County, Estonia.

The area of the nature reserve is 55 ha.

The protected area was founded in 1968 to protect Kivimurru Pine Forest in Võtikvere village. In 2013 the protected area was designated to the nature reserve.
