= Vaiatu =

Vaiatu may refer to several places in Estonia:

- Vaiatu, Jõgeva County, village in Estonia
- Vaiatu, Lääne-Viru County, village in Estonia
