= Leedi =

Village in Estonia

- Village
- Location within Estonia
- Coordinates: 58.8631°N 26.5475°E
- Country: Estonia
- County: Jõgeva
- Parish: Jõgeva
- Time zone: UTC+02:00 (EET)
  - Summer (DST): UTC+03:00 (EEST)

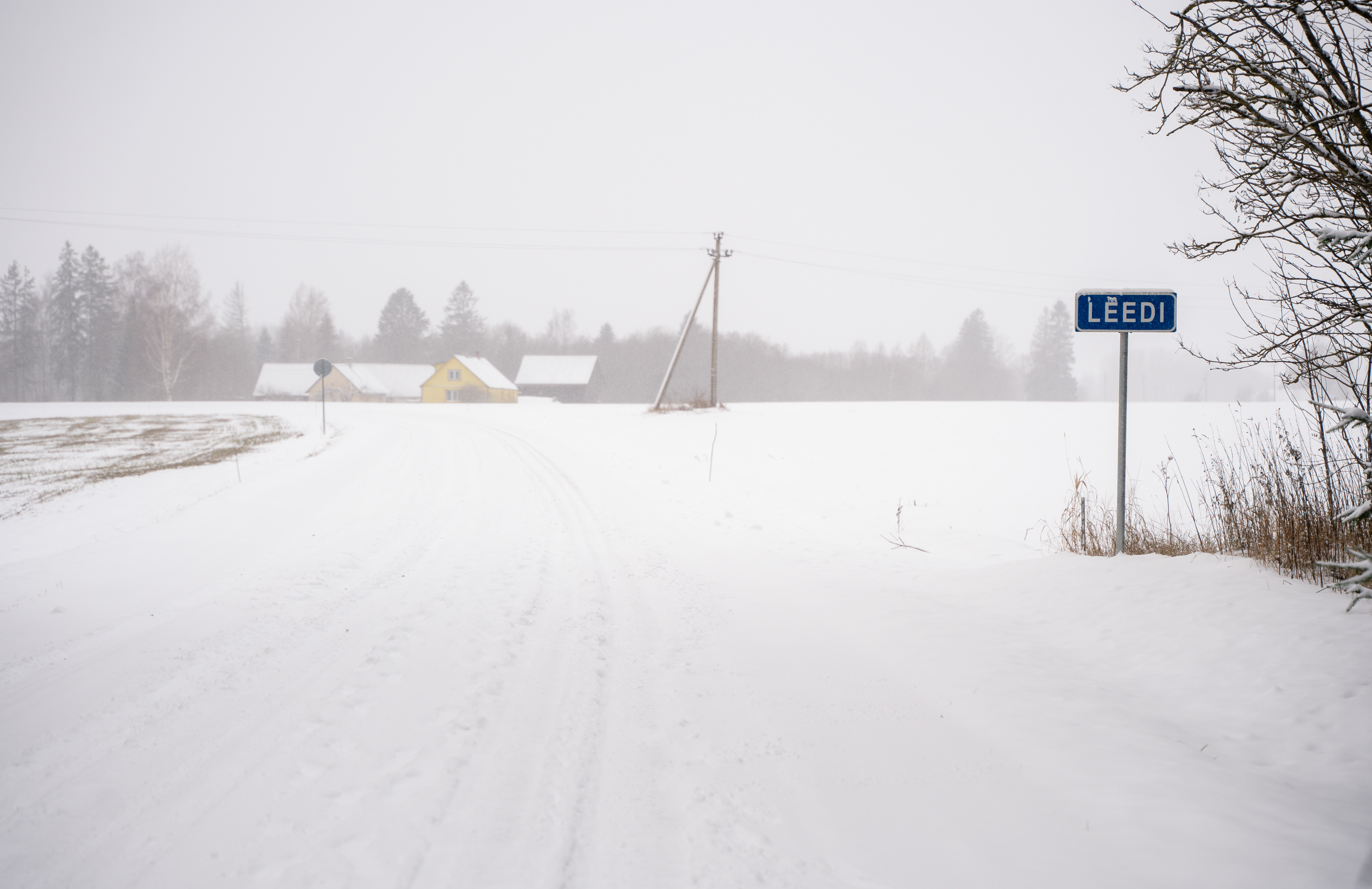
Leedi, Village in Estonia

Leedi (German: Ledis) is a village in Jõgeva parish, Jõgeva county, eastern Estonia. Before the administrative reform in Estonia it belonged to Torma parish. According to the 2011 Estonian census, the village had 64 inhabitants, all Estonians.
