= Battle of Punapargi =

Battle during the Estonian Independence War

- Part of the Estonian War of Independence and the German occupation of Estonia during WWI
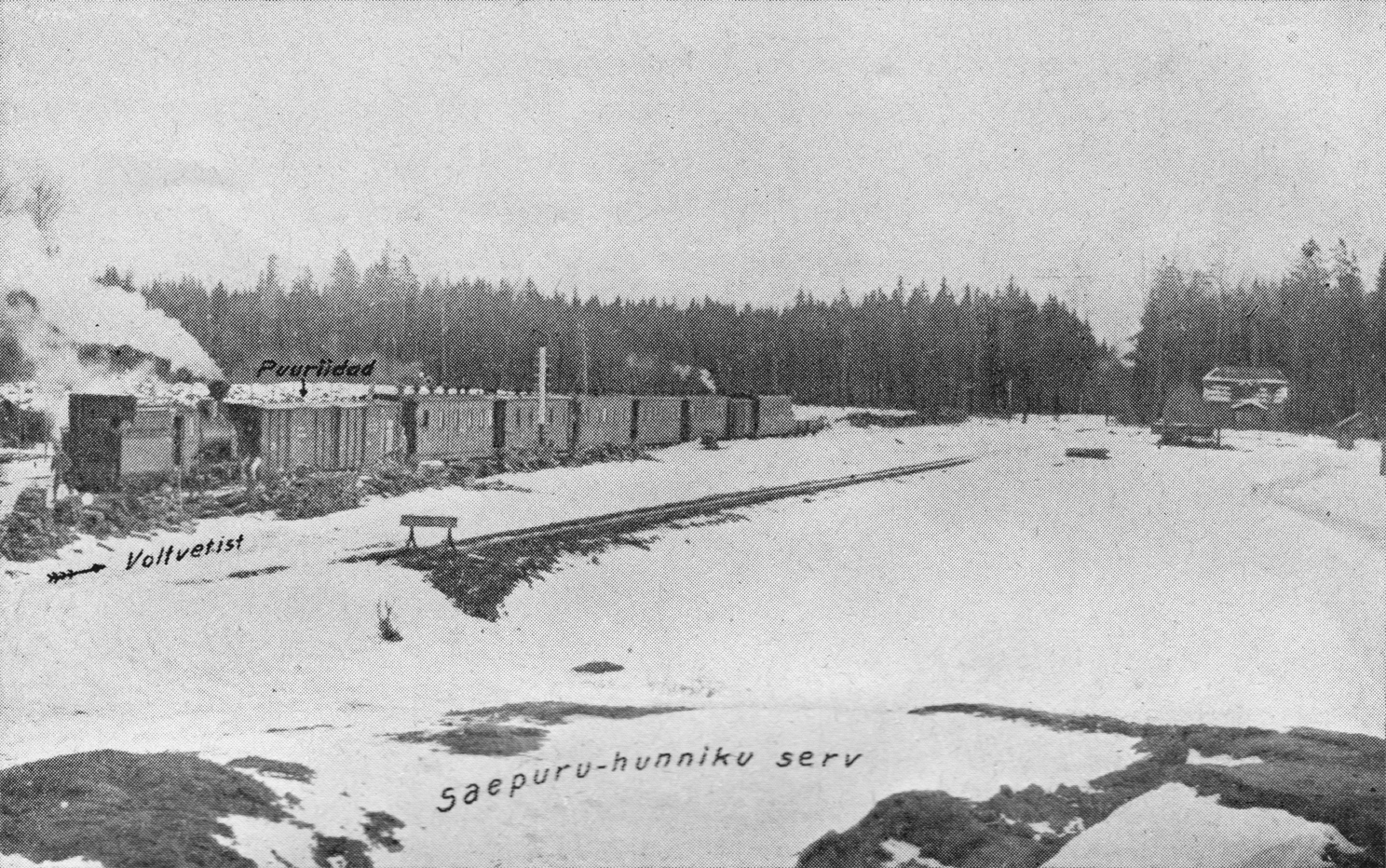
Date	23 December 1918
Location	Punapargi (Near Leipste and Tihemetsa) in Pärnu County, Estonia 58°8′N 25°2′E
Result	German victory

Belligerents
Estonia	(German Empire) Imperial German Army

Commanders and leaders
Verner Limberg	Ludwig von Estorff

Strength
40 men 2 heavy machine guns	500–1,000 men 1 light cannon

Casualties and losses
9 killed 3 wounded	22 killed 30 wounded

The Battle of Punapargi (Estonian: Punapargi lahing) was a skirmish during the Estonian Independence War between Estonian soldiers of the 6th Infantry Regiment and the retreating Imperial German forces near Punapargi in Pärnu County on 23 December 1918.

== Background ==
In October 1917, the German Imperial Army occupied the West Estonian archipelago, and in 1918, most of mainland Estonia was occupied.

After the formal end of the First World War in November 1918, the German Imperial Army which occupied Estonia was starting to withdraw from Estonia and other occupied territories.

On 17 December 1918, the commander of the 6th Estonian Infantry Regiment, Juhan Puskar, ordered a group of Scouts to monitor the withdrawing German forces in Saarde Parish, Pärnu County. The group of soldiers were ordered to refrain from starting a battle with the German forces during negotiations.

== Course of the Battle ==
On December 23, 40 Estonian Scouts with two heavy machine guns left Mõisaküla headed towards Punapargi. The soldiers arrived at Punapargi by train. A column of German soldiers were seen moving along the railway. The Estonian forces wanted to engage in negotiations. The Estonian soldiers dismounted from the train, and reportedly a German officer fired his revolver at Verner Limberg. An Estonian soldier fired back, hitting the German officer.

The German soldiers started engaging the Estonian soldiers, who retaliated by firing on the German forces with a machine gun. German forces advanced against the Estonian forces, who were ordered by Limberg to retreat back to the trains. 7 soldiers who resisted against retreating were surrounded and killed by the Germans with bayonets. An Estonian private reportedly hid his rifle and pretended to be a sawmill worker, surviving the Germans surrounding him. The private rejoined his group after the Germans left.

== Aftermath ==
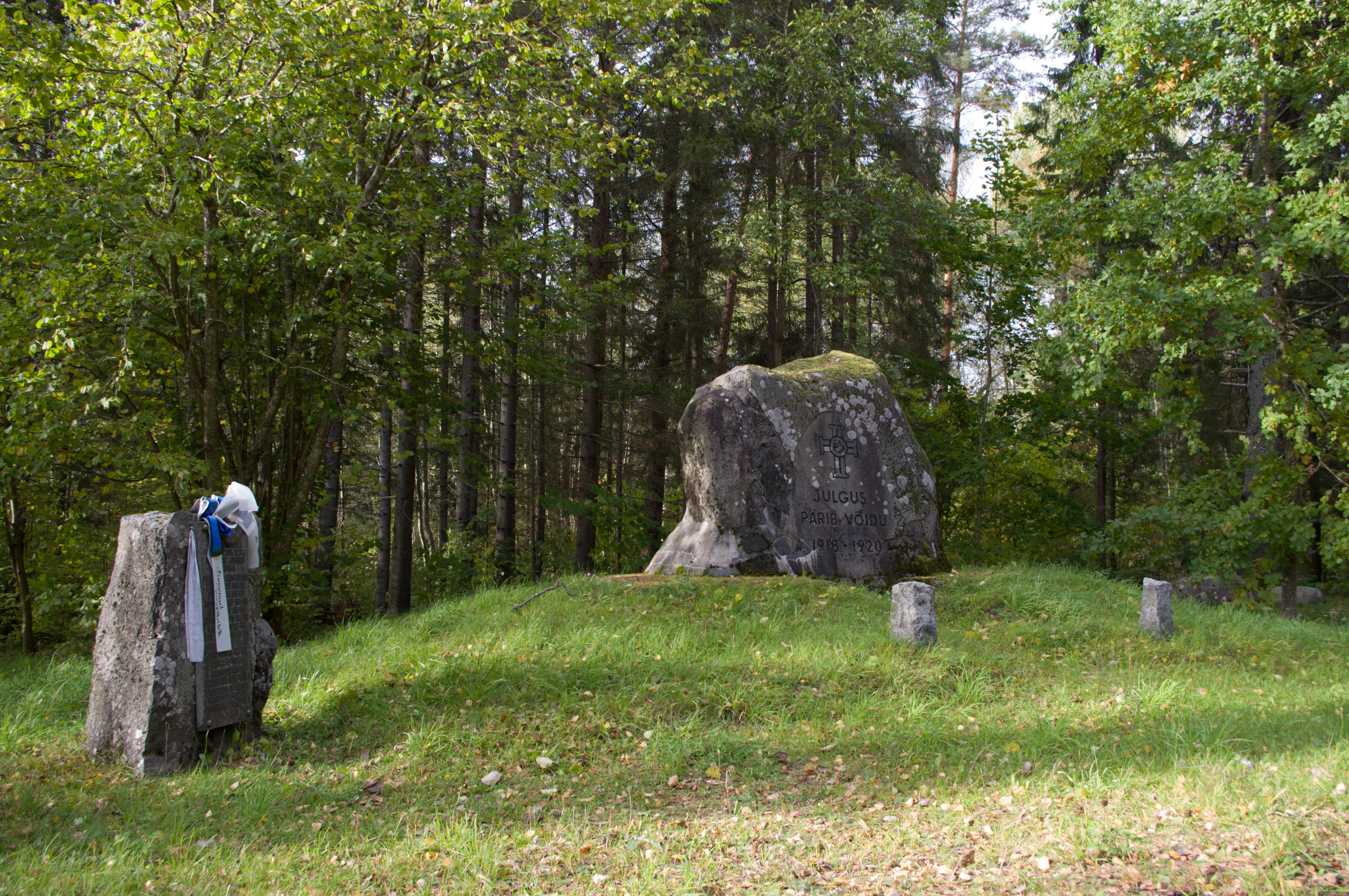
Memorial to the Battle of Punapargi in Tihemetsa

The battle lasted ~20 minutes.

The retreating Estonian forces regrouped in Tihemetsa and returned to Mõisaküla.

Losses for the Estonian forces were 9 killed and 3 wounded. Losses for the Germans numbered 22 killed and 30 wounded.

The battle was the last engagement between the Estonian forces and retreating German forces.

Fallen soldiers were buried in Saarde Cemetery, Häädemeeste, and Mazsalaca in Latvia.
