= Lilastvere =

Village in Estonia

- Village
- Location within Estonia
- Coordinates: 58°53′11″N 26°41′54″E
- Country: Estonia
- County: Jõgeva County
- Parish: Jõgeva Parish

Population (2011)
  - Total: 30
- Time zone: UTC+2 (EET)
  - Summer (DST): UTC+3 (EEST)

Lilastvere is a village in Jõgeva Parish, Jõgeva County in eastern Estonia.

As of the 2011 Census, the settlement's population was 30.
