= Liikatku =

Village in Estonia

- Village
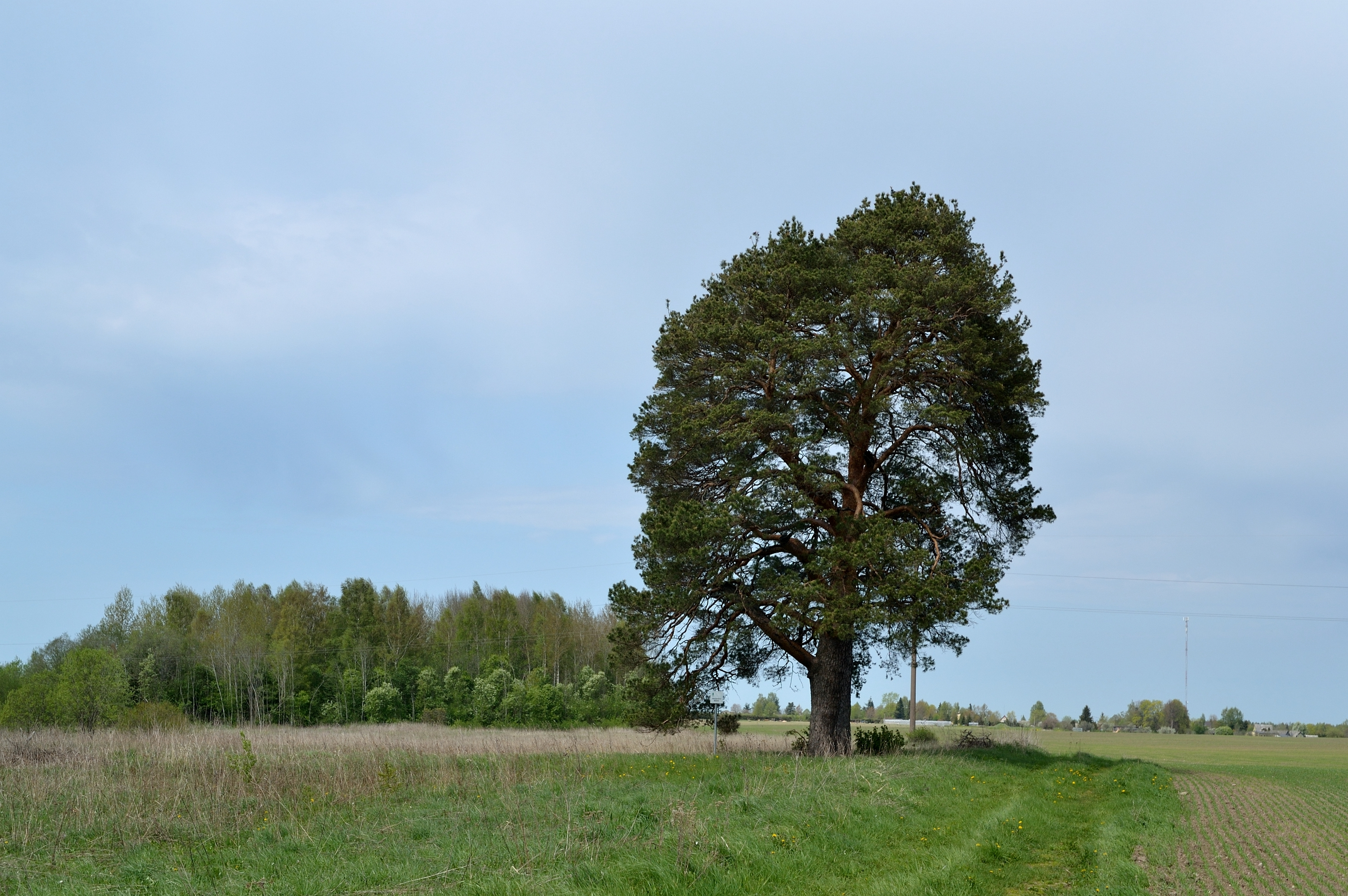
- The protected "prophet pine" on the eastern edge of the village

- Location within Estonia
- Coordinates: 58.7975°N 26.711944444444°E
- Country: Estonia
- County: Jõgeva County
- Parish: Jõgeva Parish
- Time zone: UTC+2 (EET)
  - Summer (DST): UTC+3 (EEST)

Liikatku is a village in Jõgeva Parish, Jõgeva County in Estonia.

== See also ==
- Administrative division of Estonia
