= List of wars involving Latvia =

This is a list of wars that the Republic of Latvia has participated in throughout its history as a duchy (1561–1795) and as a modern-day republic (1918–1940; 1990–present-day)

This list doesn't include the Latvian Soviet Socialist Republic since according to the theory of state continuity of the Baltic states, the republic of Latvia existed as a de jure sovereign state from 17 June 1940 to 4 May 1990 and was represented by the Latvian Diplomatic Service, which controlled limited state functions during its occupation. Latvia did not engage in warfare during this period.

Victory
Defeat
Another result*
Ongoing

*e.g. result unknown or indecisive/inconclusive, result of internal conflict inside Latvia, status quo ante bellum, or a treaty or peace without a clear result.

== Duchy of Courland and Semigallia ==
=== 16th century ===
Date	Conflict	Combatant 1	Combatant 2	Combatant 3	Result
1563	Siege of Lode (part of the Estonian campaign)	Duchy of Courland	(Swedish Empire) Sweden		Courlander victory: Swedish forces retreat

=== 17th century ===
Date	Conflict	Combatant 1	Combatant 2	Combatant 3	Result
1655–1660	Second Northern War	Polish–Lithuanian Commonwealth; Denmark–Norway (from 1657); Habsburg Monarchy; Tsardom of Russia (1656–58); Crimean Khanate; Brandenburg-Prussia (1655–56, 1657–60); Duchy of Courland (1656–58); Dutch Republic	Swedish Empire; Brandenburg-Prussia (1656–57); Principality of Transylvania; Cossack Hetmanate (1657); Wallachia; Moldavia; Susquehannock (1655) (yes) Swedish Lithuania (1655–57) (Note: Pro-Swedish Lithuanian nobility and military forces.)		Treaty of Oliva: Denmark–Norway cedes Scania, Halland, Blekinge, Bohuslän and Ven to Sweden.; Poland–Lithuania recognizes Swedish sovereignty in Livonia and Swedish ownership of Estonia and Ösel; Poland–Lithuania grants the Duchy of Prussia sovereign status.; Dutch Republic acquires New Sweden.
1658	Invasion of Courland	Duchy of Courland	(Swedish Empire) Sweden		Swedish victory: Sweden occupies Courland and Mitau; Tobago occupied by the Dutch.

=== 18th century ===
Date	Conflict	Combatant 1	Combatant 2	Combatant 3	Result
1700–1721	Great Northern War	Tsardom of Russia; Cossack Hetmanate; Kalmyk Khanate (Electorate of Saxony) Saxony (1700–1706, 1709–1719); Duchy of Courland (1700–1701); Polish–Lithuanian Commonwealth (1701–1704, 1709–1719); Sandomierz Confederation (1704–1709); Denmark–Norway (1700, 1709–1720) (Kingdom of Prussia) Prussia (1715–1720) (Electorate of Brunswick-Lüneburg) Hanover (1715–1719) (Kingdom of Great Britain) Great Britain (1717–1719); Montenegro (1711–1712); Moldavia	(yes) Swedish Empire; Holstein-Gottorp (1700–1714); Warsaw Confederation (1704–1709); Ottoman Empire (1710–1714); Crimean Khanate (1710–1714)} Cossack Hetmanate (1708–1714); Dutch Republic (1700); England (1700); Scotland (1700); Ireland (1700) (Kingdom of Great Britain) Great Britain (1719–1720)		Anti-Swedish coalition victory: The Tsardom of Russia becomes the Russian Empire; Decline of the Swedish Empire; Decline of the Polish–Lithuanian Commonwealth; Treaty of Nystad, Treaties of Stockholm, Treaty of Frederiksborg and Treaty of the Pruth
1794	Curonian Uprising	Polish-Lithuanian Commonwealth	Russian Empire; Duchy of Courland and Semigallia		Russian victory

== Republic of Latvia ==
=== 20th century ===
Date	Conflict	Combatant 1	Combatant 2	Combatant 3	Result
1918–1919	Soviet westward offensive of 1918–1919	Latvia; White Movement; Estonia; Poland; Belarus; Romania; Ukraine; France; United Kingdom; Ober Ost; Finnish, Danish, and Swedish volunteers	(Russian Soviet Federative Socialist Republic) Russian SFSR; Latvian SSR; Soviet Estonia; Lithuanian-Byelorussian SSR; Provisional Polish Revolutionary Committee; Ukrainian SSR; Finnish Red Guards		Soviet defeat in the Baltic states: Start of the Polish-Soviet War
1918–1920	Latvian War of Independence	1918 – April 1919: Latvia (Note: All Latvian national units with formal allegiance to Latvian Provisional Government were under German and Estonian military commands at this period.); (German Empire) VI Reserve Corps; Baltische Landeswehr; (Latvia) Latvian Independent Brigade; (Russia) Lieven detachment; Eiserne Division; Estonia; (Finland) Finnish volunteers; (Latvia) North Latvian Brigade; April–July 1919: Latvia; Estonia; (Latvia) North Latvian Brigade; (Denmark) Danish volunteers; July 1919–1920: Latvia (Note: Latvian Armed Forces were formed on July 10, 1919 with merger of (South) Latvian Independent Brigade and North Latvian Brigade.); Baltische Landeswehr (Note: Fought only against Soviets.); Poland; Estonia; United Kingdom (Note: Naval support.); France	1918 – April 1919: Soviet Russia; Soviet Latvia; April–July 1919: (German Empire) VI Reserve Corps; Baltische Landeswehr; (Latvia) (South) Latvian Independent Brigade; (Russia) Lieven detachment; Eiserne Division; October–December 1919: West Russian Volunteer Army (Note: Fought only against Latvia and its allies.); Freikorps; (Russia) Russian units	April–July 1919: Soviet Russia; Soviet Latvia; July 1919–1920: Soviet Russia; Soviet Latvia	Latvian victory: Latvian–Soviet Peace Treaty; West Russian Volunteer Army evacuate to East Prussia; Independence of Latvia
1919–1921	Polish–Soviet War	Poland; Ukraine (1920); Belarus (1920); Latvia (1920)	Russian SFSR; Ukrainian SSR; Byelorussian SSR; Polrewkom		Polish victory: Peace of Riga; Independence of Poland; Ukraine and Belarus merged into Soviet Union
1934	1934 Latvian coup d'état	(Latvia) Pro-Ulmanis Groups: Government of Latvia; Latvian Farmers' Union; Aizsargi	(Latvia) Anti-Ulmanis Groups: Saeima; Latvian Social Democratic Workers' Party; Pērkonkrusts		Pro-Ulmanis victory: Coup d'état successful
1939–1945	World War II; Occupation of the Baltic states	Republic of Latvia (1940)	Soviet Union: (Latvian Soviet Socialist Republic) Latvian SSR	Nazi Germany: Reichskommissariat Ostland (1941–44)	Nazi German defeat; Soviet victory: Soviet occupation (1940); German occupation (1941); Soviet re-occupation (1944)
1945–1956	Guerrilla war in the Baltic states	(Estonia) Estonian partisans (Latvia) Latvian partisans (Lithuania) Lithuanian partisans	Soviet Union		Soviet victory: Defeat of the partisans
1991	The Barricades (part of the Singing Revolution)	Latvia	Soviet Union		Victory: Dissolution of Riga OMON; Eventual independence of Latvia on 21 August 1991

=== 21st century ===
Date	Conflict	Combatant 1	Combatant 2	Combatant 3	Result
2001–2021	War on terror	United States of America; United Kingdom; Poland; Latvia (other allies)	(al-Qaeda) Al-Qaeda: various allies		Mixed results
2012-	Central African Republic Civil War	Central African Republic: Central African Armed Forces; MINUSCA (since 2014) Rwanda Russia: Wagner Group; South Africa (2013); MISCA (2013–2014); EUFOR RCA: Latvia	Coalition of Patriots for Change Anti-balaka MPC		Ongoing

== See also ==
- List of wars involving Estonia
- List of wars involving Lithuania
- List of wars involving Poland
