= Kõnnu, Saaremaa Parish =

Village in Estonia

Kõnnu
- Village
- Location in Estonia
- Coordinates: 58°26′31″N 22°47′45″E
- Country: Estonia
- County: Saare County
- Municipality: Saaremaa Parish

Population (2011 Census)
  - Total: 41

Kõnnu is a village in Saaremaa Parish, Saare County, Estonia, on the island of Saaremaa. In 2011, the settlement's population was 41.
