= Tähkvere =

Village in Estonia

- Village
- Location within Estonia
- Coordinates: 58.881666666667°N 26.623611111111°E
- Country: Estonia
- County: Jõgeva County
- Parish: Jõgeva Parish
- Time zone: UTC+2 (EET)
  - Summer (DST): UTC+3 (EEST)

Tähkvere (German: Flemmingshof) is a village in Jõgeva Parish, Jõgeva County in Estonia.
