= Kodismaa =

Village in Estonia

- Village
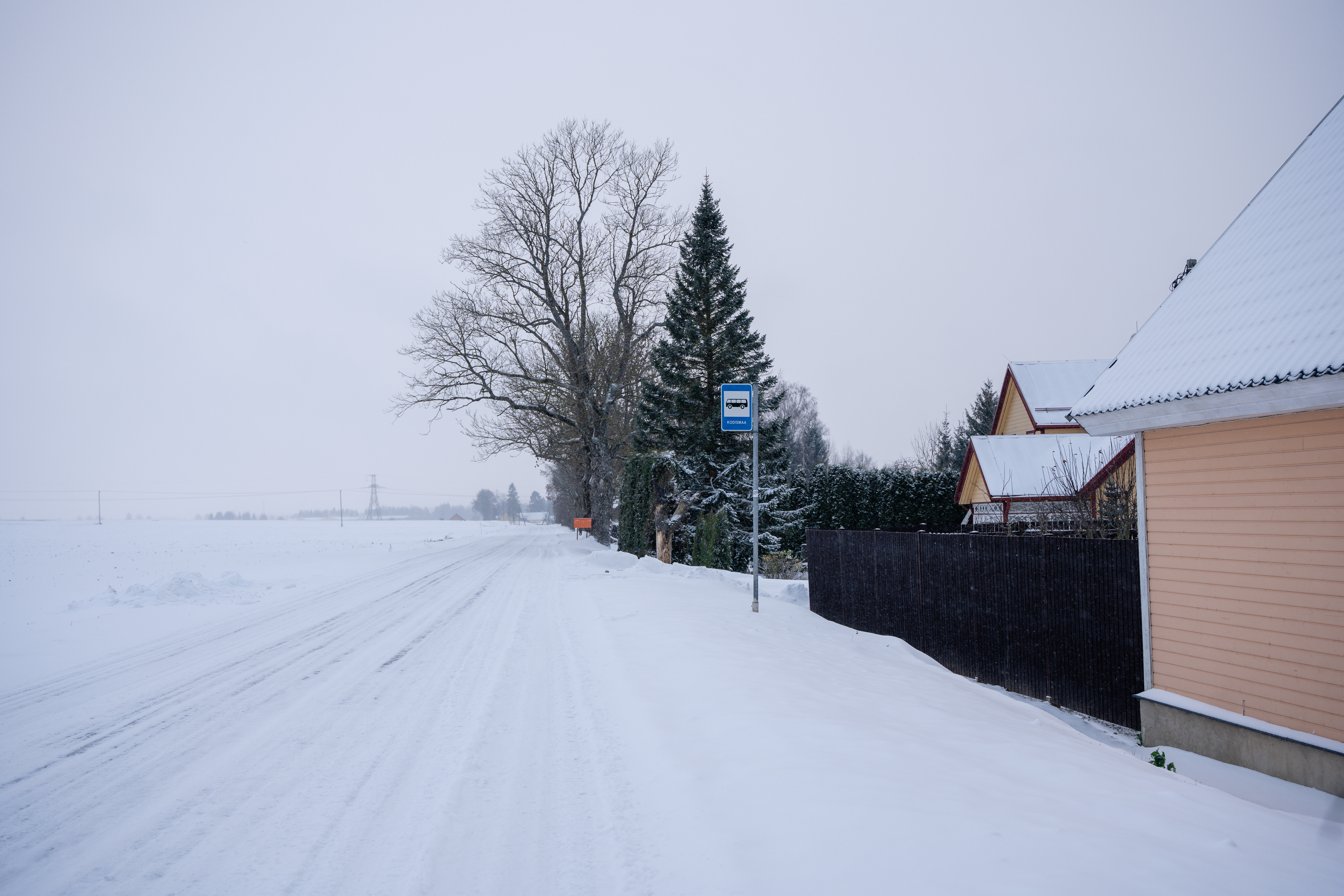
- Kodismaa village in November, 2022

- Location within Estonia
- Coordinates: 58.844722222222°N 26.592222222222°E
- Country: Estonia
- County: Jõgeva County
- Parish: Jõgeva Parish
- Time zone: UTC+2 (EET)
  - Summer (DST): UTC+3 (EEST)

Kodismaa is a village in Jõgeva Parish, Jõgeva County in Estonia.
