= Tõikvere =

Village in Estonia

- Village
- Location within Estonia
- Coordinates: 58.803888888889°N 26.655833333333°E
- Country: Estonia
- County: Jõgeva County
- Parish: Jõgeva Parish
- Time zone: UTC+2 (EET)
  - Summer (DST): UTC+3 (EEST)

Tõikvere (German: Toikfer) is a village in Jõgeva Parish, Jõgeva County in Estonia.
