= Tihemetsa =

Borough in Estonia

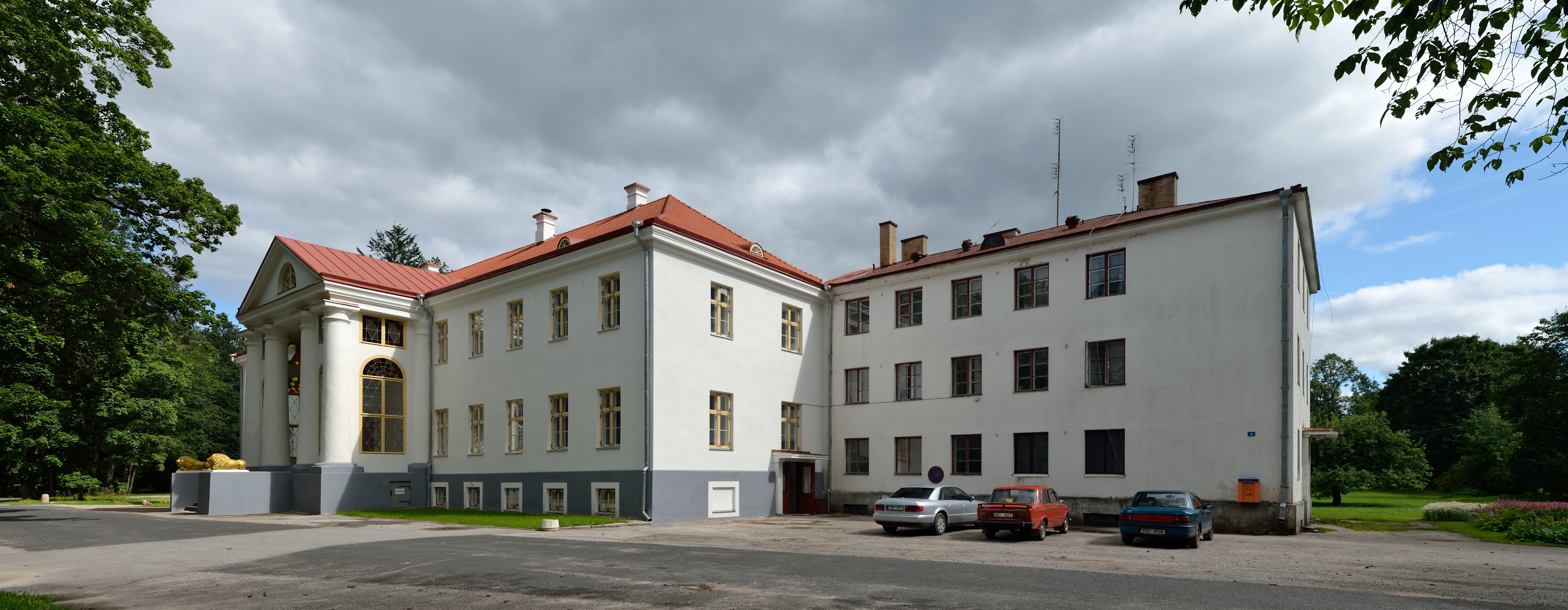

- Location within Estonia
- Coordinates: 58°8′43″N 25°2′39″E
- Country: Estonia
- County: Pärnu County
- Parish: Saarde Parish
- Time zone: UTC+2 (EET)

Tihemetsa is a small borough (alevik) in Saarde Parish, Pärnu County in southern Estonia.

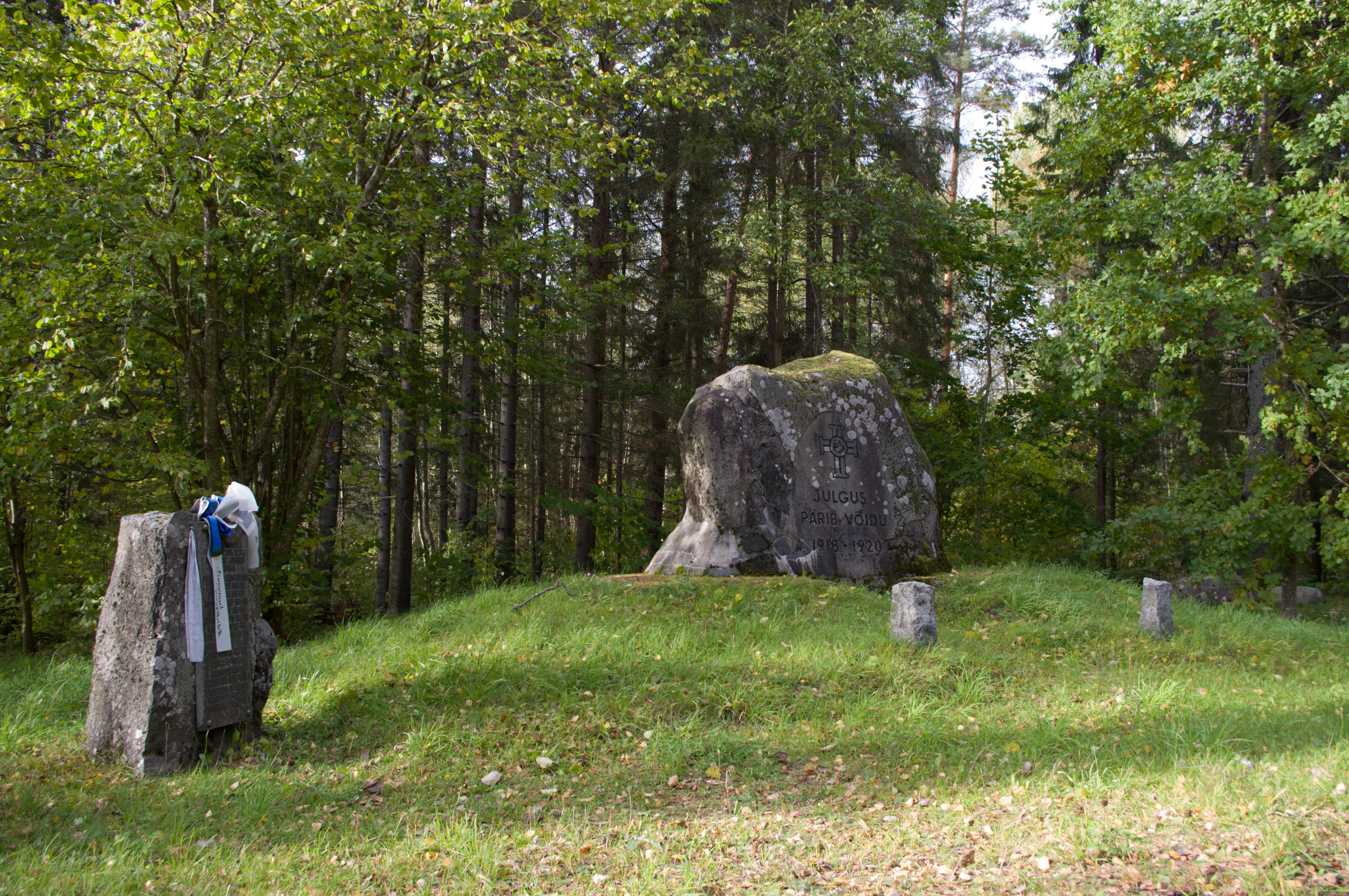
Monument

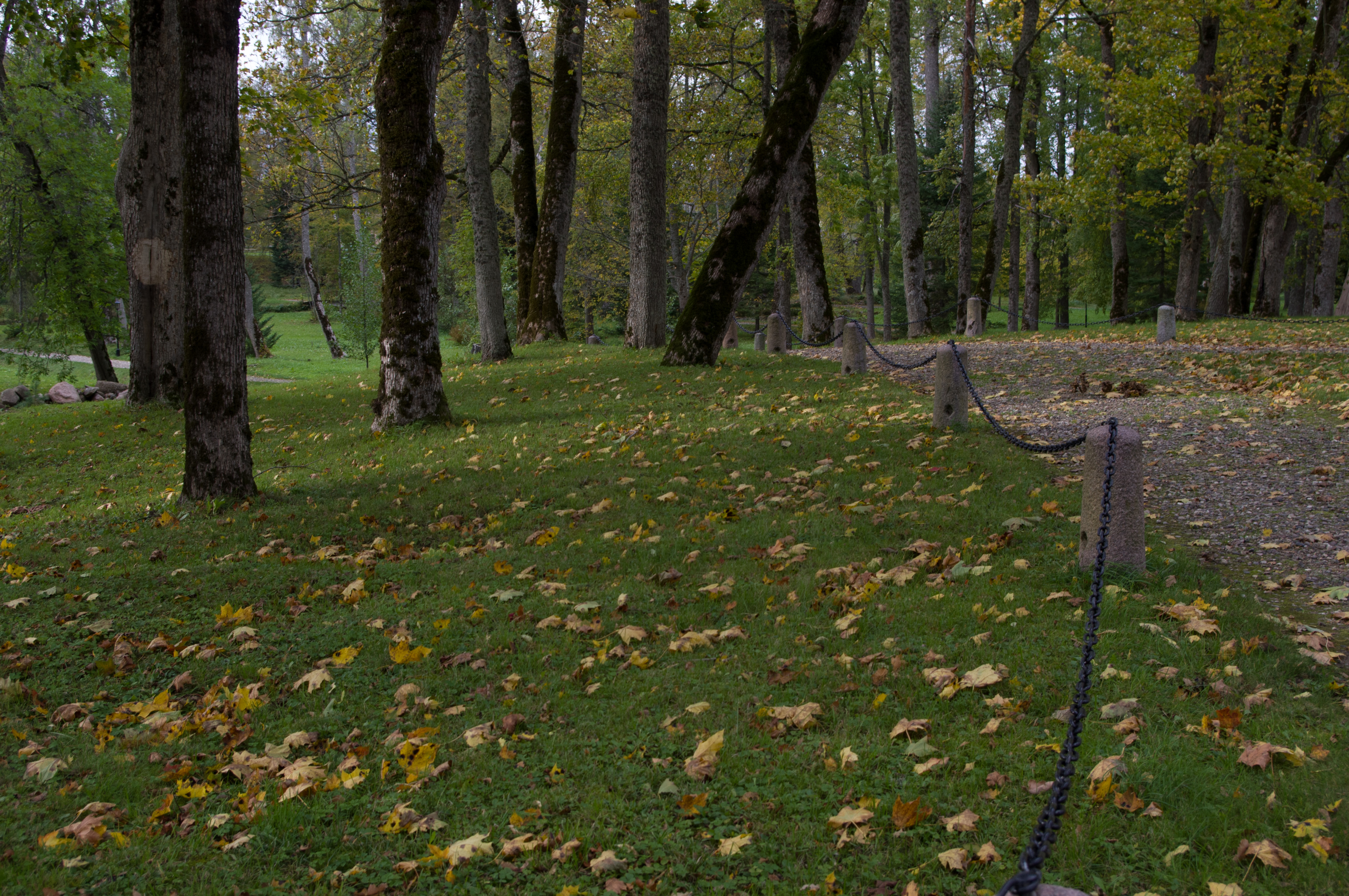
Manor park
