= Kantküla, Jõgeva County =

Village in Estonia

- Village
- Location within Estonia
- Coordinates: 58.825277777778°N 26.59°E
- Country: Estonia
- County: Jõgeva County
- Parish: Jõgeva Parish
- Time zone: UTC+2 (EET)
  - Summer (DST): UTC+3 (EEST)

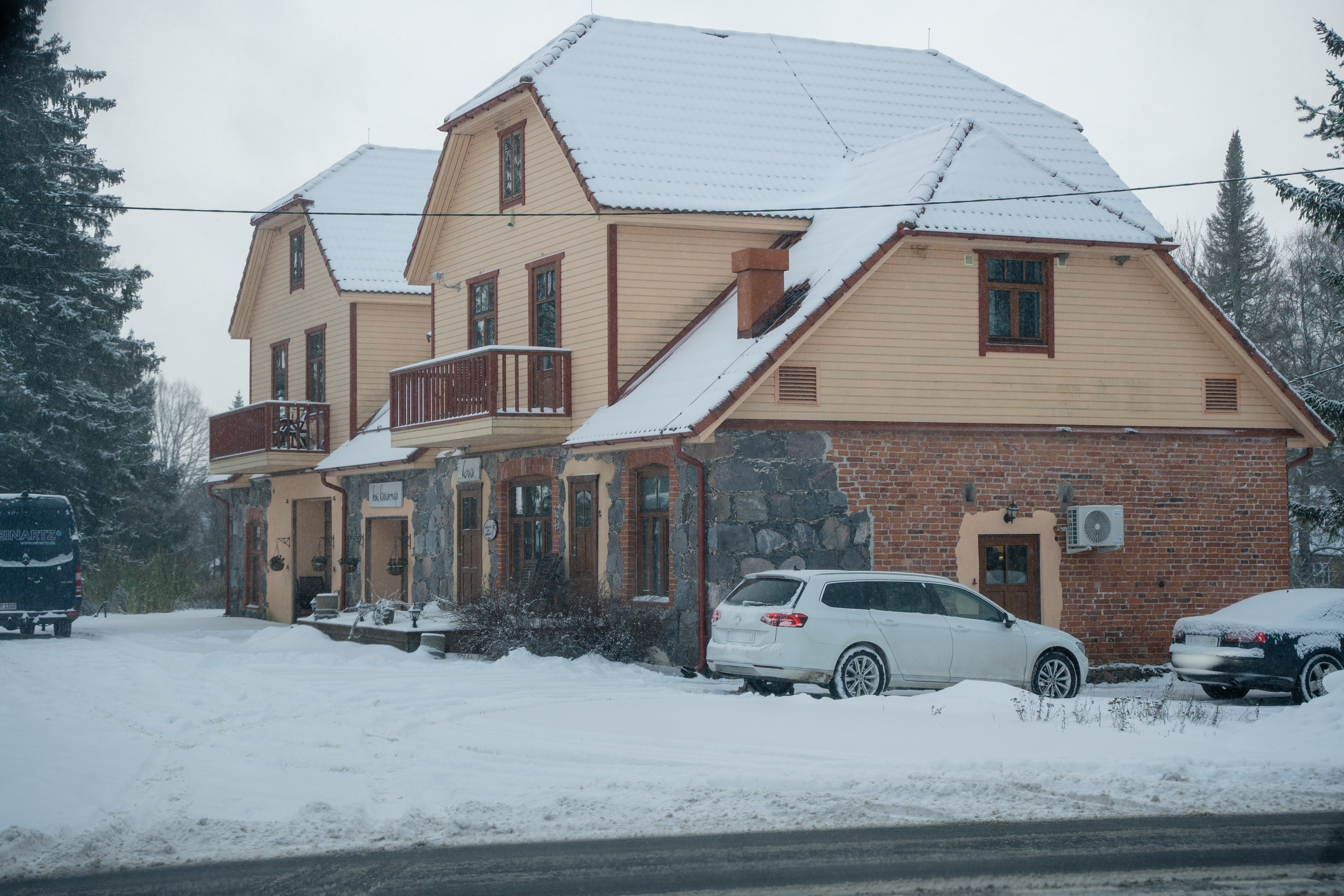

Kantküla is a village in Jõgeva Parish, Jõgeva County in Estonia.
