= Torma, Estonia =

Borough in Estonia

Torma
- Small borough
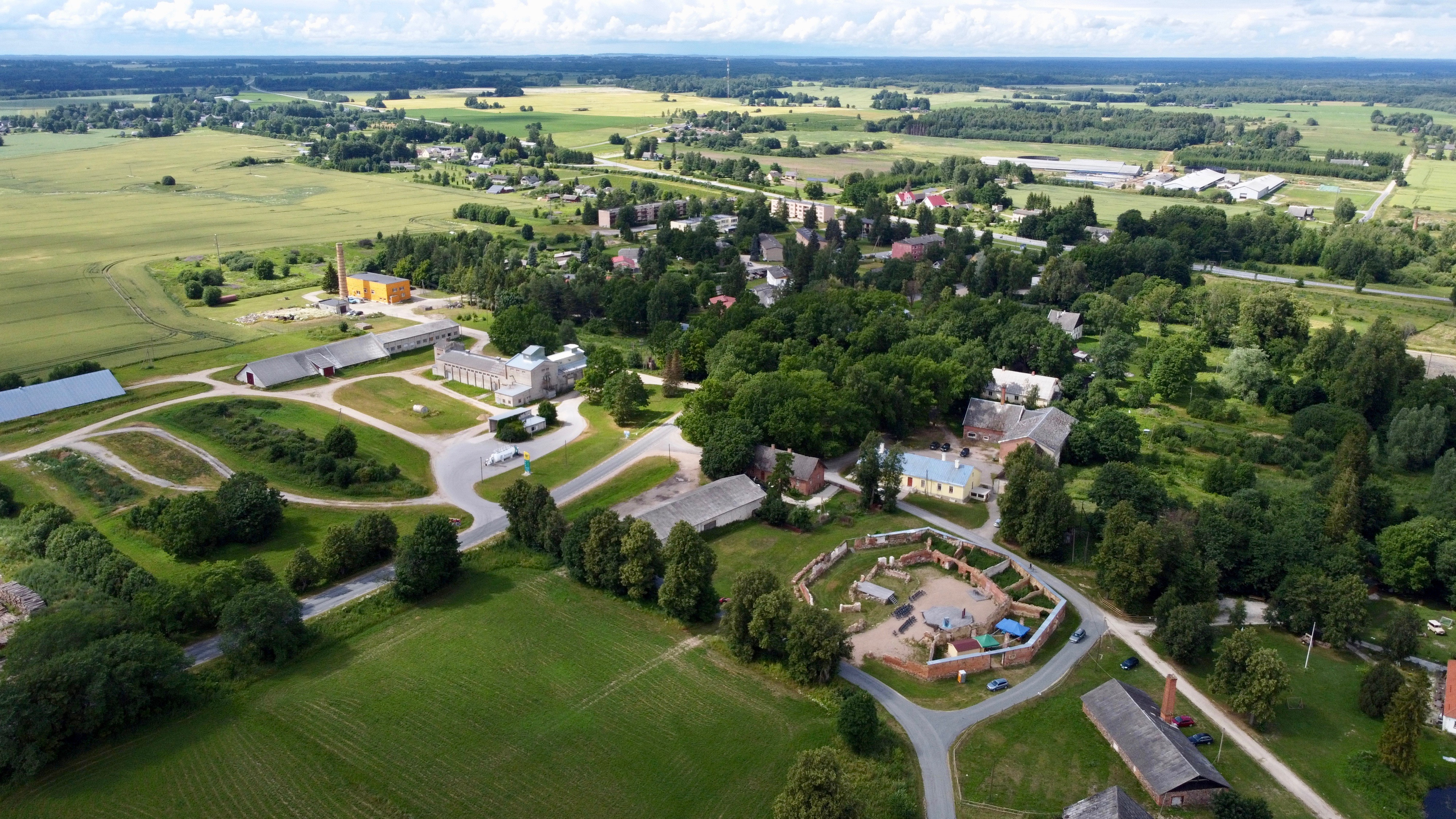

- Location in Estonia
- Coordinates: 58°49′11″N 26°44′30″E
- Country: Estonia
- County: Jõgeva County
- Municipality: Jõgeva Parish

Population (2019)
  - Total: 383

Torma is a small borough (Estonian: alevik) in Jõgeva Parish, Jõgeva County, Estonia. As of the 2011 Census, the settlement's population was 396. In 2019, the population was found to have decreased to 383.

Drone video of Torma in Estonia (July 2022)
