= Võtikvere =

Village in Estonia

- Village
- Location within Estonia
- Coordinates: 58.863333333333°N 26.838333333333°E
- Country: Estonia
- County: Jõgeva County
- Parish: Mustvee Parish
- Time zone: UTC+2 (EET)
  - Summer (DST): UTC+3 (EEST)

Võtikvere (German: Wottigfer) is a village in Mustvee Parish, Jõgeva County in Estonia.
