= Kärasi Nature Reserve =

Protected area in Estonia

- Location within Estonia
- Location: Estonia
- Coordinates: 58°57′00″N 26°58′30″E
- Area: 598 ha (1,480 acres)
- Established: 1996 (2017)

Kärasi Nature Reserve is a nature reserve which is located in Jõgeva County, Estonia.

The area of the nature reserve is 598 ha.

The protected area was founded in 1996 to protect valuable habitat types and threatened species in the villages of Kärasi, Piilsi, Separa and Tammispää (all in the former Lohusuu Parish).
