= 5th Division (Yugoslav Partisans) =

5th Krajina Division
- Flag of Democratic Federal Yugoslavia (used by the Partisans)
- Active: 1942–1945
- Country: Democratic Federal Yugoslavia
- Branch: Yugoslav Partisan Army
- Type: Infantry
- Size: Division
- Part of: 1st Bosnian Corps (1 November 1942 – mid-October 1943); 1st Corps (mid-October 1943 – 1945)
- Engagements: World War II in Yugoslavia

Commanders
- Notable commanders: Slavko Rodić; Milutin Morača

The 5th Krajina Division (Serbo-Croatian Latin: Peta krajiška divizija) was a Yugoslav Partisan division formed in Glamočko polje on 9 November 1942.

It was divided into three brigades on the day of formation: the 1st Krajina Brigade, the 4th Krajina Brigade, and the 7th Krajina Brigade. The division was commanded by Slavko Rodić, while its political commissar was Ilija Došen. It was a part of the 1st Bosnian Corps until mid-October 1943 when it became a part of the 1st Corps. The division fought against Germans, Independent State of Croatia (NDH) and Chetniks in Bosnia, Serbia and Croatia.

On March 7, 1943, the Seventh Brigade was excluded from the division, and the Tenth Krajina Strike Brigade was attached to the division. From November 1943 to February 1944, the division included the Garibaldi Division, composed of Italians. From September 20 to the end of October 1944, the division included the 21st Serbian Brigade, and from December 12, 1944, the Yugoslav Brigade, formed in the Soviet Union. On November 30, 1944, the Artillery Brigade became also part of the Fifth Krajina Division.

== Formation of the division ==
On 9 November 1942, by a Supreme Commander Josip Broz Tito's order, the 5th Krajina Division was formed with Slavko Rodić as its commander. The division was formed from three brigades: the 1st Krajina Brigade, the 4th Krajina Brigade and the 7th Krajina Brigade. The 5th Division was subordinated to 1st Bosnian Corps upon its formation.

== Operations ==
=== Attack on Sanski Most ===
First action undertaken by the 5th Division as a whole was an attack on Sanski Most, strategically important town in Bosnanska Krajina. In order to carry out this attack, Staff of the 5th Division brought all of its brigades to the village Donja Kozica near Sanski Most on 5 December 1942. At that time, the 1st Krajina Brigade was participating in the battles at Bosanski Novi which it left in order to conduct a forced march to Donja Kozica, while the 4th Krajina Brigade and one battalion of the 7th Krajina Brigade were located nearby Donja Kozica so they had no trouble arriving there. On 6 December, Staff of the 1st Bosnian Corps ordered an attack on Sanski Most by the 4th and 5th Divisions. It was planned that attack should commence on 10 December at 23:00, with two brigades of 4th Division and two brigades and one battalion of the 5th Division taking part in it. The 4th Division was tasked with capturing part of the town on the west side of the Sana river, while the 5th Division was to capture part of the town on the east side of the river as well as the nearby villages.

The 4th Division began the attack at the planned time, capturing garrisons on the west side of Sanski Most, however 5th Division commenced its attack two hours later than planned. This delay was caused by the choice of the unit to move in one column in order to covertly approach village of Kijevo, southeast of Sanski Most. The 2nd Battalion of the 4th Brigade together with 2nd Brigade of the 4th Division attacked part of Sanski Most east of Sana, capturing several bunkers, gendarmerie station and the town hospital during the night. In the morning of 11 December, German reinforcements arrived to the town center from where they conducted a successful counteroffensive which pushed all Partisan units from the town by the afternoon. Following skirmishes for the villages nearby Sanski Most in which 4th Brigade captured Kijevo and 7th Brigade failed to capture Sasina, Staff of the 1st Bosnian Corps ordered the units to stop fighting and rest until 22:00 that day, when they were to attempt to capture Sanski Most again.

The 4th Brigade successfully captured village of Čaplje but Partisan units were again unsuccessful in their attempt to capture Sanski Most. Staff of the 1st Bosnian Corps decided that the units should, for a third time, attempt to capture Sanski Most on 13 December at 23:00. In the evening of 13 December, part of the 7th Brigade captured Sasina but it was decided that 5th Division shouldn't participate in the final attempt to capture Sanski Most which was once again unsuccessful. During the battles for Sanski Most and nearby villages, the 5th Division killed or wounded 290 and captured 241 enemy soldiers. It also captured 257 rifles, 6 submachine guns, 2 mortars and lot of ammunition. The division suffered losses of 67 killed, 4 missing and 122 wounded.

=== Further operations in Bosanska Krajina ===
After failing to capture Sanski Most, Staff of the 1st Bosnian Corps decided to blockade enemy garrison in the town. Two battalions of the 1st Krajina Brigade blockaded Sanski Most on the east side of Sana river. One of the 1st Brigade's battalions together with one battalion of the 4th Krajina Brigade held Sanski Most–Prijedor railway near the village of Mitrovići, while most of the 4th Brigade was directed to Bronzani Majdan. The 7th Krajina Brigade fought against Chetniks in the area between the villages of Stričići and Vilusi. During the blockade of Sanski Most, units of the 5th Division participated in several smaller battles. On 15 December 1942, two battalions of the 4th Brigade repulsed an attack on Sasina. Two days later, units at Sanski Most–Prijedor railway conducted an ambush on a train carrying enemy soldiers whom they forced to retreat after heavy fighting.

On 18 December, German and Home Guard force of 400–500 men unsuccessfully attacked units of the 5th Division positioned on the railway, after repulsing the attack the units conducted a counteroffensive in which they captured villages of Rakelići, Gaćani and Miljakovci (7 km south of Prijedor). On 25 December, two battalions of the 4th Brigade, entered Bronzani Majdan without fighting as Home Guard soldiers garrisoned in the village fled north to avoid a battle. One battalion of the 4th Brigade destroyed all the bridges on Gomjenica river during 2–6 January. Two days later, 4th Brigade conducted an anti–Chetnik operation in the villages of Kmećani, Vilusi, Pervan and Goleši. In mid–January, German forces defeated 1st Krajina Brigade which was blocking the railway towards Sanski Most, forcing it to retreat south. Germans brought more forces to various garrisons in North Bosnia which preluded a large–scale anti–Partisan operation named Operation Weiss.

=== Operation Weiss ===
Operation Weiss was a major campaign of the Axis forces, attempting to eliminate the Yugoslav partisan forces of Tito. The campaign was in retaliation to the partisans success in liberating significant territories in western Bosnia. the operation had two phases.

==== Phase I January 1943 ====
On 19 January 1943, a day before Operation Weiss began, units of the 5th Division were stationed in the villages between German–held Sanski Most and Partisan–held Ključ. On the next day, German 749th Regiment of the 717th Infantry Division, supported by Luftwaffe, crossed river Sana and defeated two battalions of the 5th Division at the village of Vrhpolje but its further advance on that day was repulsed.

==== Phase II February-March 1943 ====
During the second phase of the operation offensive forces pushed Tito's forces south towards Neretva River. Tito's surprise tactic was to demolish the bridges on river Nerevta, making Axis forces think his forces are retreating elsewhere, only to quickly rebuild them and let his forces and wounded escape encirclement.

=== Later operations ===
During 1943, the division carried out several successful attacks, among which the capture of Kakanj in June and the attack on Rajlovac Airport in August stand out.

During December 1943, the division waged heavy maneuvering battles against units of the 5th SS Corps during Operation Kugelblitz in eastern Bosnia.

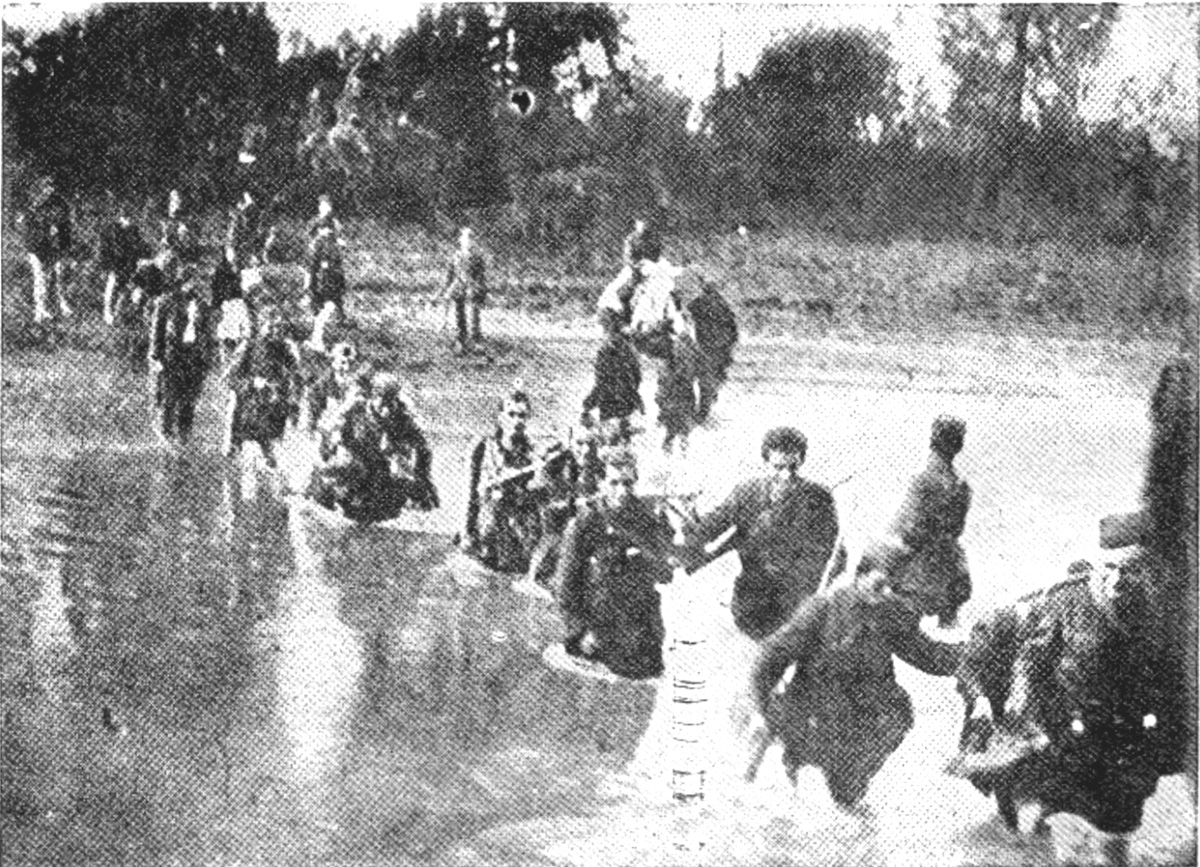
Units of the 5th Krajina Division cross the River Vrbanju, May 1943.

From March to May 1944, she took part in the advance through Serbia, and then in the fights against the Germans, Chetniks and the Muslim Legion in Sandzak and eastern Bosnia. From the beginning of August 1944, the Fifth Krajina Division fought under the direct command of the Main Staff of the National Liberation Army and Partisan Detachments of Serbia in the battle of Kopaonik and the battles in the valley of the West Morava. From October 1944 to April 1945 it participated in the battles on the Syrmian Front. On January 17, 1945, during an offensive strike by the German 34th Army Corps, the division suffered heavy losses, and some of its units were defeated. During April 1945, it participated in the breakthrough of the Syrmian Front and the liberation of Slavonski Brod.
