= Vilusi =

Vilusi may refer to the following places:

- Vilusi, Estonia, a village in Estonia
- Vilusi, Banja Luka, a village near Banja Luka in Bosnia and Herzegovina
- Vilusi (Gradiška), a village near Gradiška in Bosnia and Herzegovina
- Vilusi, Nikšić, a village in Montenegro
