= Education in Estonia =

Ministry of Education and Research
- Minister of Education and Research: Kristina Kallas

National education budget (2015)
- Budget: 812.7 million EUR (4% of GDP)

General details
- Primary languages: Estonian, Russian, English
- System type: National

Literacy (2015)
- Total: 100%
- Male: 100%
- Female: 100%

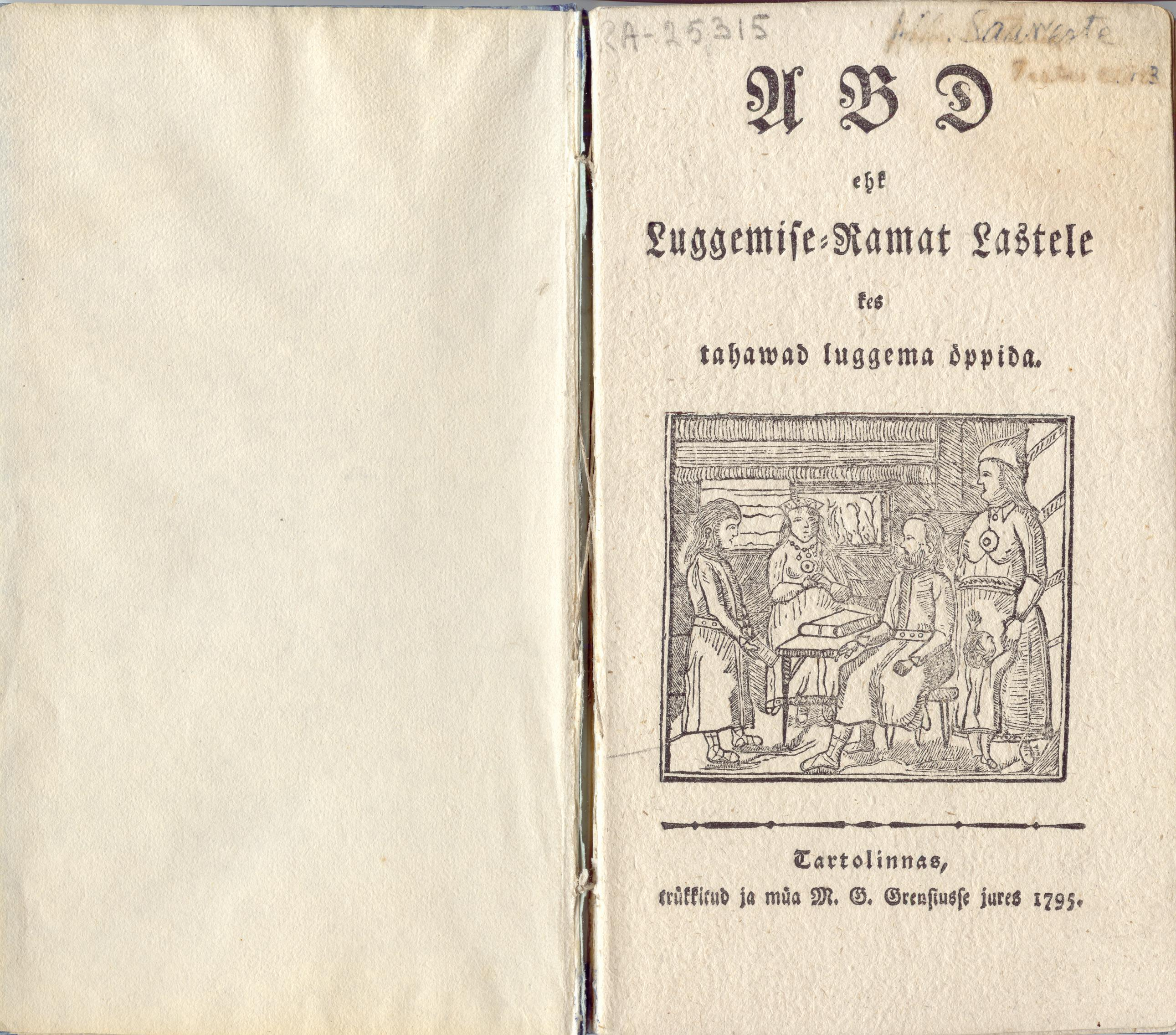
ABD ehk Luggemise-Ramat Lastele ("ABD or the Reading Book for Children"), textbook by Otto Wilhelm Masing, title page (1795).

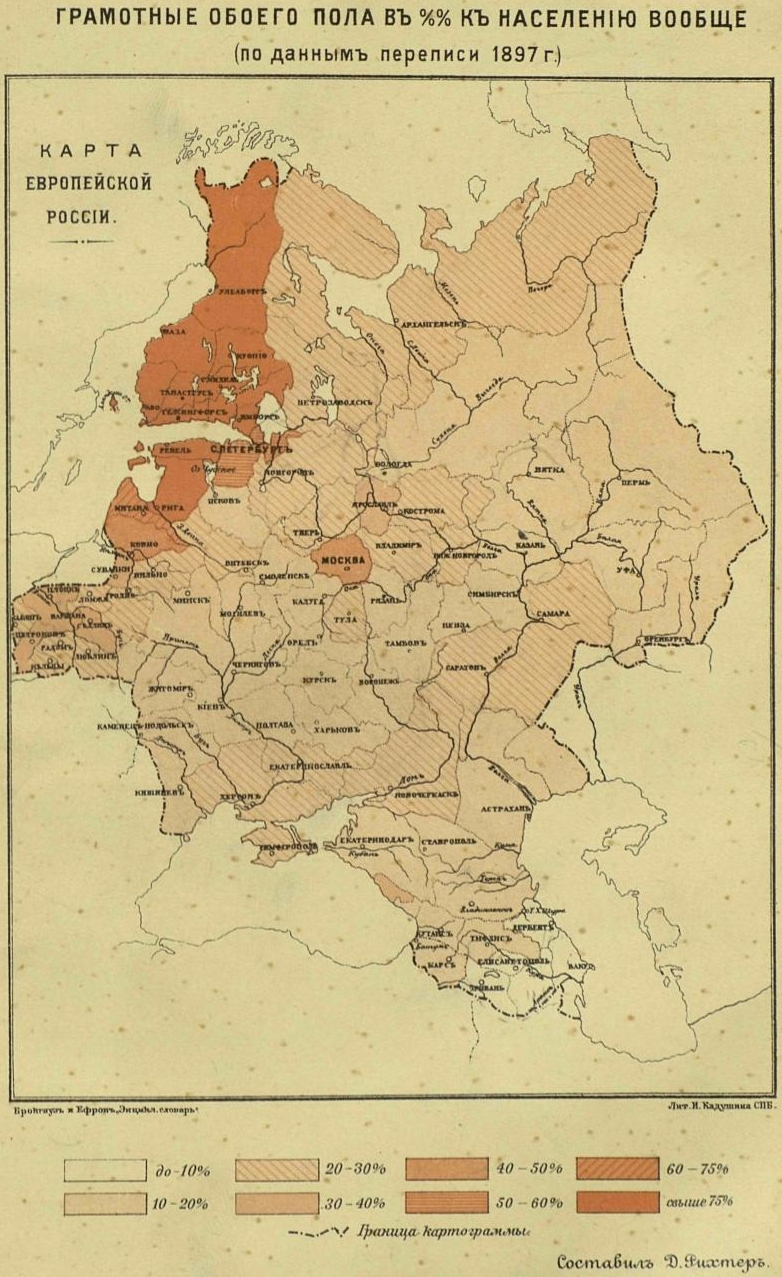
Public education systems founded during prior Swedish rule made Estonia and Finland the two most literate areas of Russian Empire (map of 1897 census literacy data)

The history of formal education in Estonia dates back to the 13–14th centuries when the first monastic and cathedral schools were founded. The first primer in the Estonian language was published in 1575. The oldest university is the University of Tartu which was established during the reign of King Gustav II Adolf of Sweden in 1632. The beginnings of the Estonian public education system appeared in the 1680s, largely due to efforts of Bengt Forselius, who also introduced orthographical reforms to written Estonian.

Today's education in Estonia is divided into general, vocational and hobby education. The education system is based on four levels which include pre-school, basic, secondary and higher education. A wide network of schools and supporting educational institutions has been established. The Estonian educational system consists of state, municipal, public and private educational institutions. There are currently 589 schools in Estonia.

Academic higher education in Estonia is divided into three levels: bachelor's studies, master's studies, and doctoral studies. In some specialties (basic medical studies, veterinary, pharmacy, dentistry, architect-engineer and a classroom teacher program) the Bachelor and Master's levels are integrated into one unit. Also bakalaureusekraad awarded before or on year 2002 are equivalent to the Master's level degrees awarded after implementing the Bologne Process on 1 September 2002. Estonian public universities have significantly more autonomy than applied higher education institutions. In addition to organizing the academic life of the university, universities can create new curricula, establish admission terms and conditions, approve the budget, approve the development plan, elect the rector and make restricted decisions in matters concerning assets. Estonia has a moderate number of public and private universities. The largest public universities are Tartu University, Tallinn University of Technology, Tallinn University, Estonian University of Life Sciences, Estonian Academy of Arts, Estonian Academy of Music and Theatre and the largest private university is the International University of Audentes.

The Estonian Academy of Sciences is Estonia's national academy of science. The IT industry in Estonia started in the late 1950s as the first computer centers were established in Tartu and Tallinn. Estonian specialists contributed in the development of software engineering standards for different ministries of the Soviet Union during the 1980s.

Estonia started connecting all its schools to the internet very early. Tiigrihüpe (Estonian for Tiger Leap), founded in 1996, was a project undertaken by the state to heavily invest in the development and expansion of computer and network infrastructure in Estonia, with a particular emphasis on education. Thanks to its early adoption of education technology, Estonian schools also moved seamlessly online during the Covid-19 pandemic in 2020.

In the 2022 Program for International Student Assessment (PISA) report, Estonia’s 15-year-olds rank 1st in Europe. In the world, Estonia’s students rank 6th in reading, 6th in mathematics and 6th in sciences.

To support whole-student-approach in personalised way, Estonian schools are systematically supporting students' well-being and mental health.

In 2024, a phased introduction of Estonian as the language to be used in all schools will begin, starting in preschool and the first and fourth grades. In the 2021/2022 school year, 13.5% of students studied using the Russian language, and this group underperformed when compared to students using the Estonian language.

== Pre-school education ==
Pre-school education is delivered to children between the ages of three and seven in especially dedicated educational institutions. The main aim of the early stages education is to support the child's family through fostering the child's growth and development by taking into account their individuality. Facilities for the pre-school education are provided by the local authorities at the request of parents. Pre-school children's institutions follow state curricula that is specifically formulated for the purpose. Children who have passed the pre-school curriculum will be issued a certificate that records the child's development. The parents will submit this certificate to the school where the child will be enrolled.

== Basic comprehensive education ==
The basic compulsory educational system in Estonia is the nine-year comprehensive school (Estonian põhikool, "basic school"), for which school attendance is mandatory (homeschooling is allowed, but rare). Basic education serves as the mandatory minimum of general education requirement, which can be acquired either partially in primary schools (grades 1 to 6), basic schools (grades 1 to 9) or upper secondary schools that also teach basic school curricula.

First four grades of primary school are called Algkool which can be translated as "beginning school" and can be confused with primary school. In some low density population areas Algkool is the only school available and students enter primary school in a bigger town.

Basic education is made available through national curriculum of basic school or simplified curriculum for basic school.

Graduating the basic school requires that the student learns the curriculum at least a satisfactory level together with passing three basic school graduation exams consisting of the Estonian language or Estonian as a second language, mathematics and an exam on a subject of the student's choice as well as completing a creative assignment.

Following graduation from basic school, there are a number of possibilities for continuation of the educational path. There is a possibility to acquire general secondary education at upper secondary school, vocational secondary education at some vocational education institution or simply an occupation.

Students’ knowledge, skills and proficiency are usually assessed on a five-point scale where «5» is «very good», «4» is «good», «3» is «satisfactory», «2» is «poor» and «1» is «weak». Schools can use a different marking system and for classes 1 to 3 or 4 a descriptive marking system that does not use numbers.

== Secondary education ==
Secondary education is based on basic education and divided into general secondary education, provided by upper secondary schools, and vocational secondary education, provided by vocational educational institutions. General secondary education constitutes a set of knowledge, skills and competences, set out in the national curriculum for upper secondary schools, the acquiring of which is the precondition for further studies at universities and vocational educational institutions. Upper secondary education is not mandatory.

General secondary education is acquired at the gymnasium (in Estonian "gümnaasium"), which is an upper secondary school. The upper secondary school is a general education school, which follows on from basic school and has a nominal study period of three years. Upper secondary schools consisting of years 1 to 12 (i.e. the study period lasts 12 years) have historically prevailed in Estonia. Everyday learning is based on school curricula prepared based on the national curriculum for upper secondary schools.

Upper secondary schools prepare students to participate in society and pursue further education in fields suited to their abilities and interests. The upper secondary curriculum consists of compulsory and elective courses.

Graduation from upper secondary school requires the student to complete a curriculum consisting of at least 96 individual courses passed at a satisfactory level as a minimum, passing the state exams consisting of the Estonian language or Estonian as a second language, mathematics and a foreign language exam, passing the upper secondary school exam as well as completing a student research paper or practical work during the entire study period.

Attaining general secondary education entitles students to continue their studies at a higher educational institution or to obtain vocational education.

== Curricula ==
The national curricula for basic and upper secondary schools The national curricula establish the standard for basic and general secondary education. The curricula are implemented in all basic and upper secondary schools of Estonia, regardless of the schools legal status, unless otherwise stipulated by the law.

The curricula designed for basic and upper secondary schools are structured around subject groups. In upper secondary schools, the subjects are divided into courses. The minimum study load required for graduation must encompass at least 96 courses, which are divided between obligatory and optional courses. Subject specific curricula make provisions for opportunities for combining subject-specific and inter-disciplinary approaches through employing cross-curriculum topics and unified approaches to evaluation.

International curricula According to the Basic Schools and Upper Secondary Schools Act, it is possible to conduct studies in Estonia by following the curriculum formulated under the aegis of either the International Baccalaureate Organization (IBO) or the Statute of the European Schools. In Estonia, the opportunity to study according to the IBO curricula is provided by the Tallinn English College, Miina Härma Gymnasium, Audentes private school and the International School of Estonia. The Statute of the European Schools serves as the charter for the operations of the Tallinn European School.

Study based on the IBO curriculums is state sponsored in municipal schools, the Tallinn English College and Miina Härma Gymnasium, whereas in private schools it is the subject to the tuition fees.

== Financing ==
According to the Basic Schools and Upper Secondary Schools Act the school's running costs will be covered by the school manager. In most cases, this means local governments. Local governments are authorised to establish, re-arrange and close general education schools. Local governments keep account of the number of compulsory attending children, ensure school attendance control, make arrangements for school transport and the provision of school meals and perform a number of related functions.

The number of the students in municipal schools will be used to calculate the amount of state subsidies allocated from the state budget to municipalities. The state subsidy is used for covering expenses on teachers’ salaries, social taxes, training and textbooks. Similar subsidies are also made available to private general education schools as prescribed by the Private Schools Act. In doing so, the state will refrain from prescribing guidelines as to the use of the funds allocated. The local government reserves the obligation and right to finance schools based on their actual needs.

== See also ==
- List of schools in Estonia
- List of universities in Estonia
