= Lohusuu =

Borough in Estonia

- Small borough
- Location in Estonia
- Coordinates: 58°56′55″N 27°2′52″E
- Country: Estonia
- County: Jõgeva County
- Municipality: Mustvee Parish

Population (2011 Census)
  - Total: 317

Lohusuu is a small borough (Estonian: alevik) in Mustvee Parish, Jõgeva County, in northeastern Estonia. It was the administrative centre of the Lohusuu Parish. As of the 2011 census, the settlement's population was 317.

== Notable people ==
- Otto Wilhelm Masing (1763–1832), linguist
