= Raadna =

Village in Estonia

Coordinates: 58°58′N 27°06′E

- Village
- Interactive map of Raadna
- Country: Estonia
- County: Jõgeva County
- Parish: Mustvee Parish
- Time zone: UTC+2 (EET)
  - Summer (DST): UTC+3 (EEST)

Raadna is a village in Mustvee Parish, Jõgeva County in northeastern Estonia. It has a small population of only 11 people as of 2021. Before the 2017 administrative reform, it was located in Lohusuu Parish.
