= Lohusuu Parish =

Former municipality of Estonia

Coordinates: 58°57′N 27°3′E

Lohusuu Parish Lohusuu vald
- Former municipality of Estonia
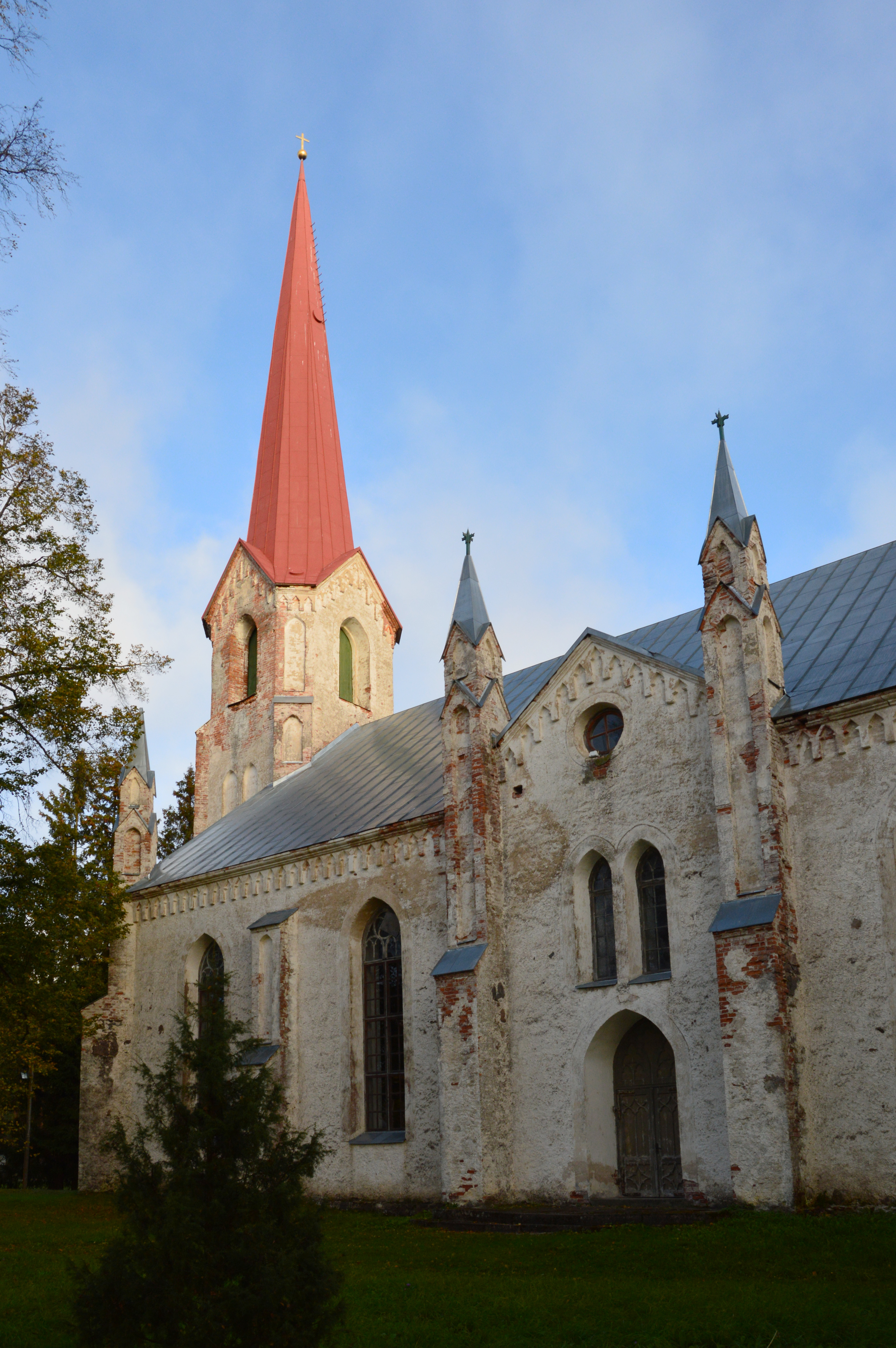
- Lohusuu church

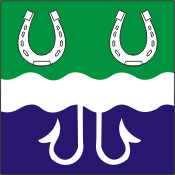
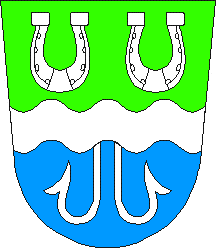
- Flag Coat of arms

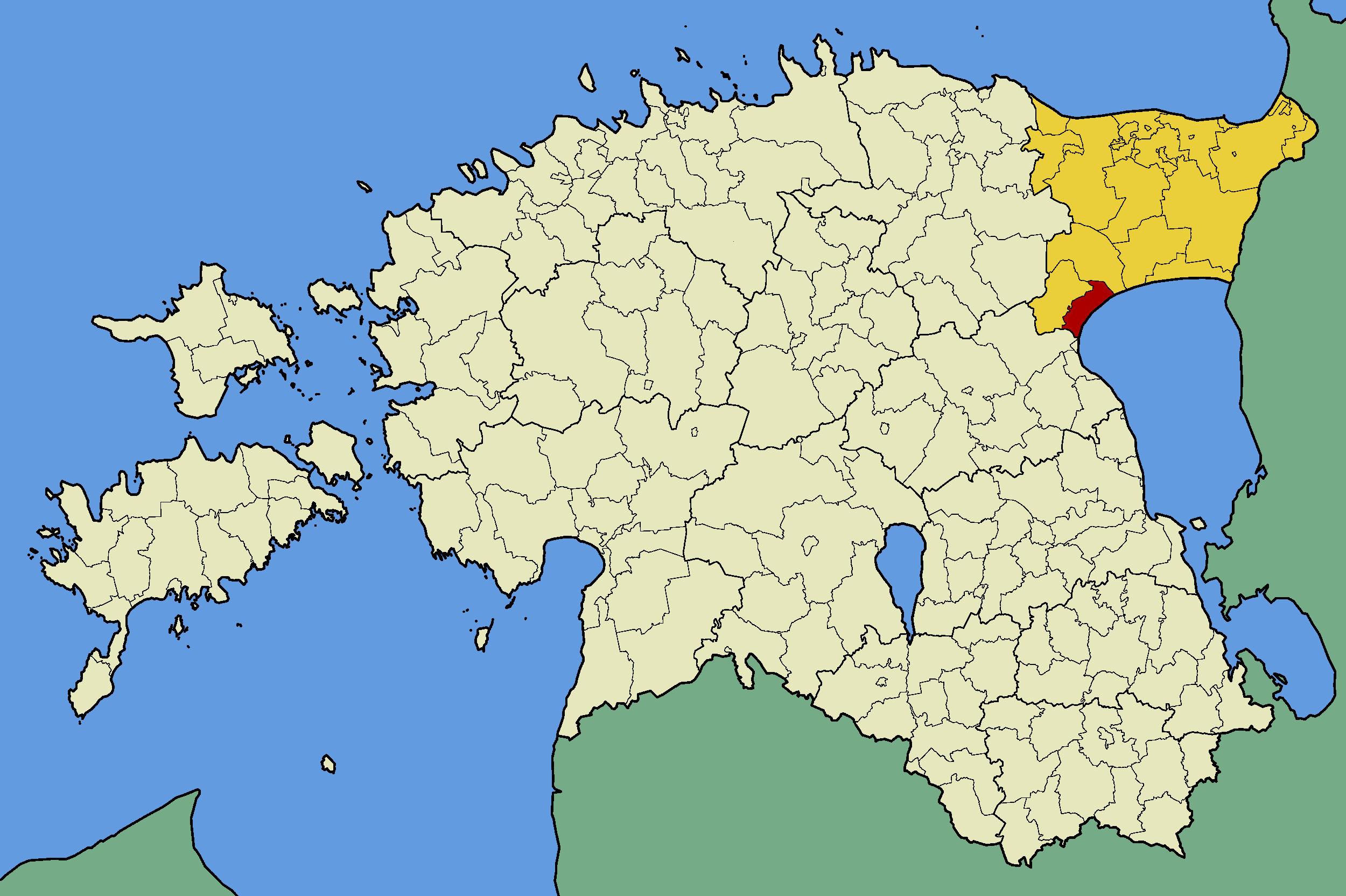
- Lohusuu Parish within Ida-Viru County.
- Country: Estonia
- County: Ida-Viru County
- Administrative centre: Lohusuu

Area
  - Total: 102 km^{2} (39 sq mi)

Population
  - Total: 818
  - Density: 8.02/km^{2} (20.8/sq mi)
- Website: www.lohusuuvv.ee

Lohusuu Parish (Estonian: Lohusuu vald) was an Estonian municipality located in Ida-Viru County. It had a population of 818 (2006) and an area of 102 km².

Small borough

Lohusuu

Villages

Jõemetsa - Kalmaküla - Kärasi - Ninasi - Piilsi - Raadna - Separa - Tammispää - Vilusi
