= Ninasi =

Village in Estonia

- Village
- Interactive map of Ninasi
- Location within Estonia
- Country: Estonia
- County: Jõgeva County
- Parish: Mustvee Parish
- Time zone: UTC+2 (EET)
  - Summer (DST): UTC+3 (EEST)

Ninasi is a village in Mustvee Parish, Jõgeva County in northeastern Estonia. Before the 2017 administrative reform, it was located in Lohusuu Parish.

References to the village were first made in 1599. In the year 2000, there were around 90 people living in the village.

Some Ninasi historical names: Nennal, Nenal, Nennasi, Ninnasi, and Ninna Station.

== History ==
Ninasi was located on the St. Petersburg - Riga - Tartu - Narva postal road. A horse Postal Station operated there between 1772 and 1877. In 1824, a Postal Station built of stone was erected. In his travel notes, French writer Honoré de Balzac, mentioned his stop at Ninasi Horse Postal Station from the end of July to early October 1843.

Catherine II (1764), Robert Schumann, Elias Lönnrot and Franz Liszt are believed to have passed through Ninasi.

The village was linked to the activities of the Decembrists in 1825. Grand Duke Michael Pavlovich was assigned to block all incoming correspondence from St. Petersburg until arrival of the Livonias ruler Konstntine's manifest (located in Warsaw) which declared his renunciation of power.

In March. 1881 the future Tsar Alexander III received notice of the assassination of his father, Tsar Alexander II, and became Emperor of Russia.

The years 1892-1916 building was customized to treat leprosy. After closing in 1916 old postal station stood empty few years. In 1919 the building was opened for Kalmavillage primary school, which operated until 1966. In recent years the building was used by the Estonian Border Guard and called Ninasi Kordon.

From year 2011 NGO Virumaa Koolituskeskus started to run Ninasi Horse Postal Station building. According to the CEO Ivo Okas, they plan to restore building as it was in 1834 including frontal majestetic arcs.

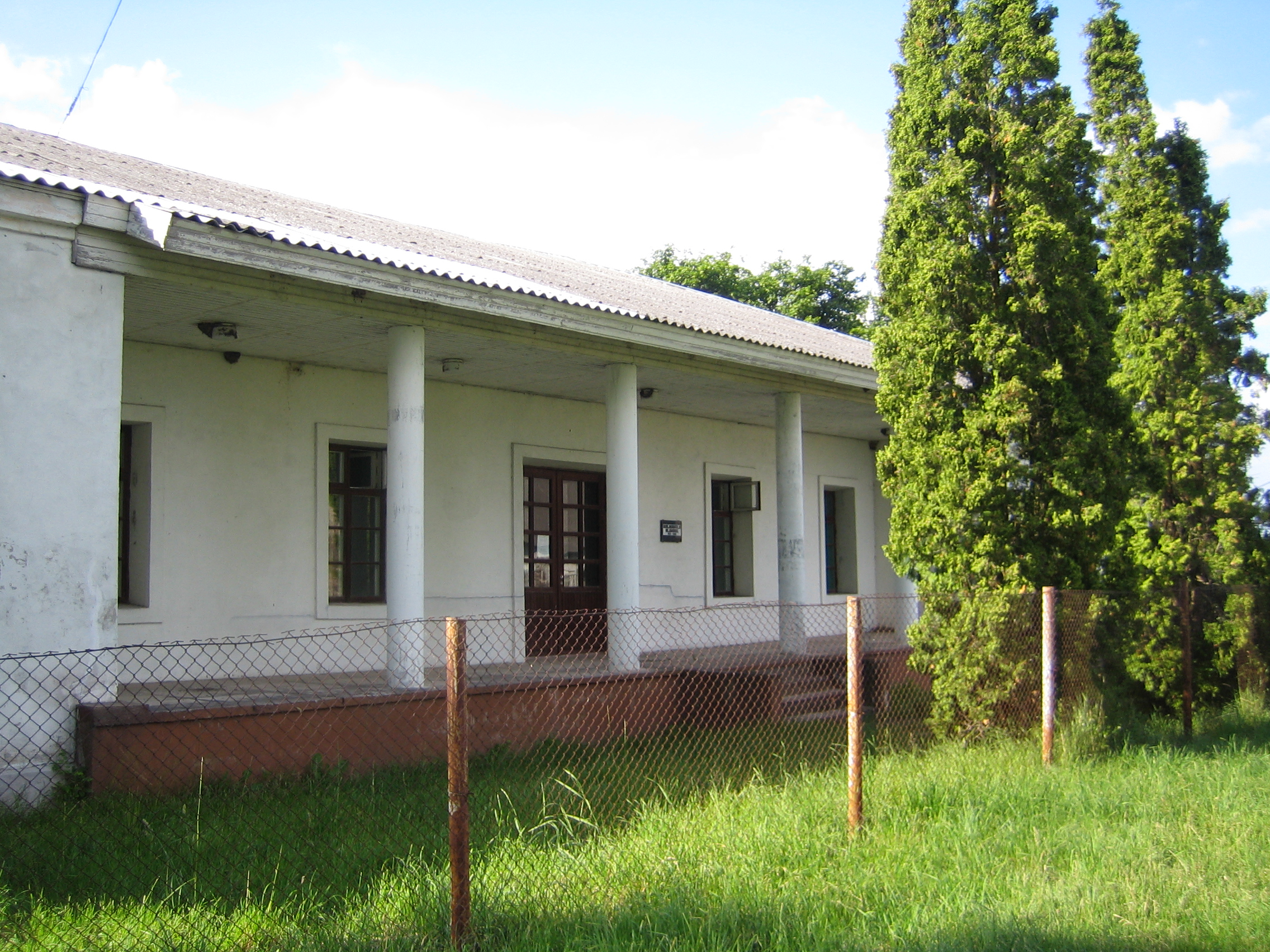

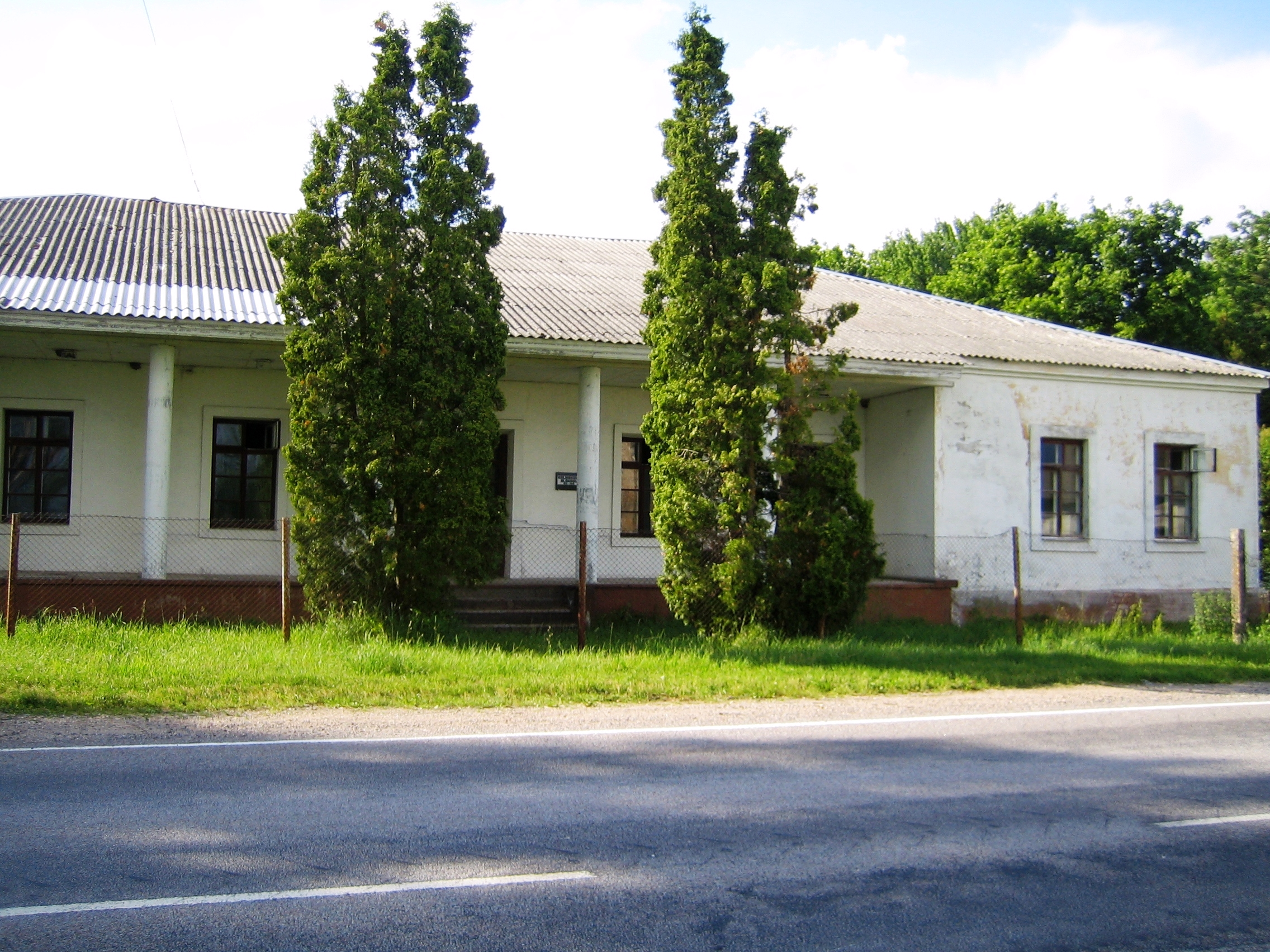

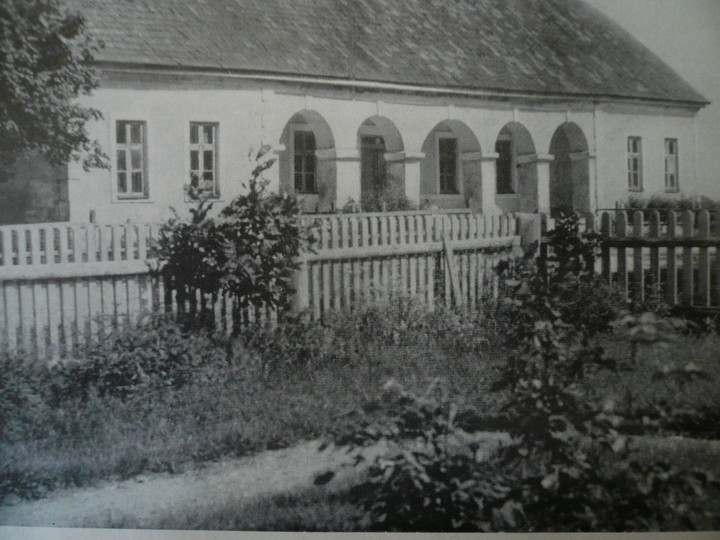

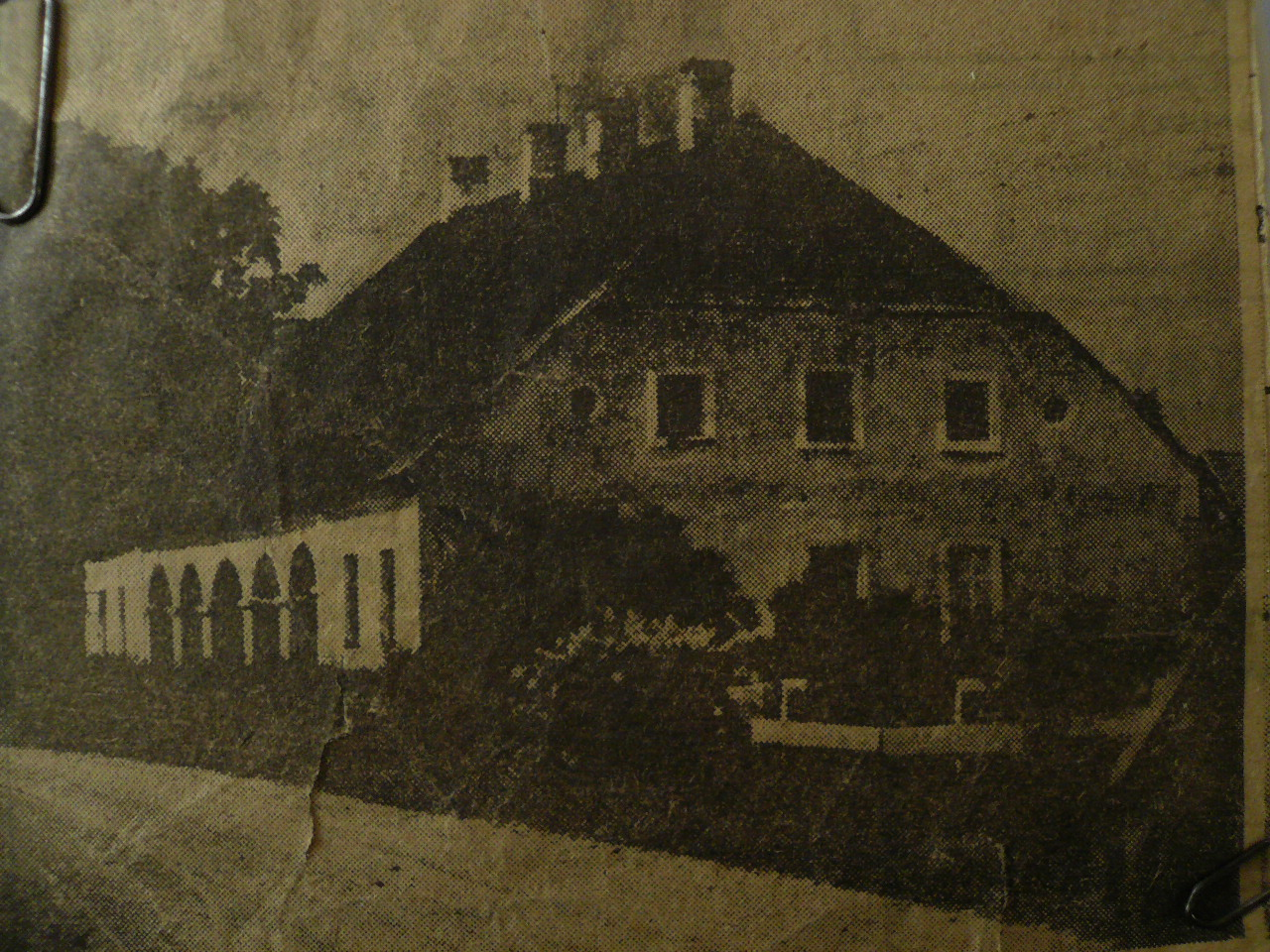
