= ABD ehk Luggemise-Ramat Lastele =

Estonian language textbook (1795)

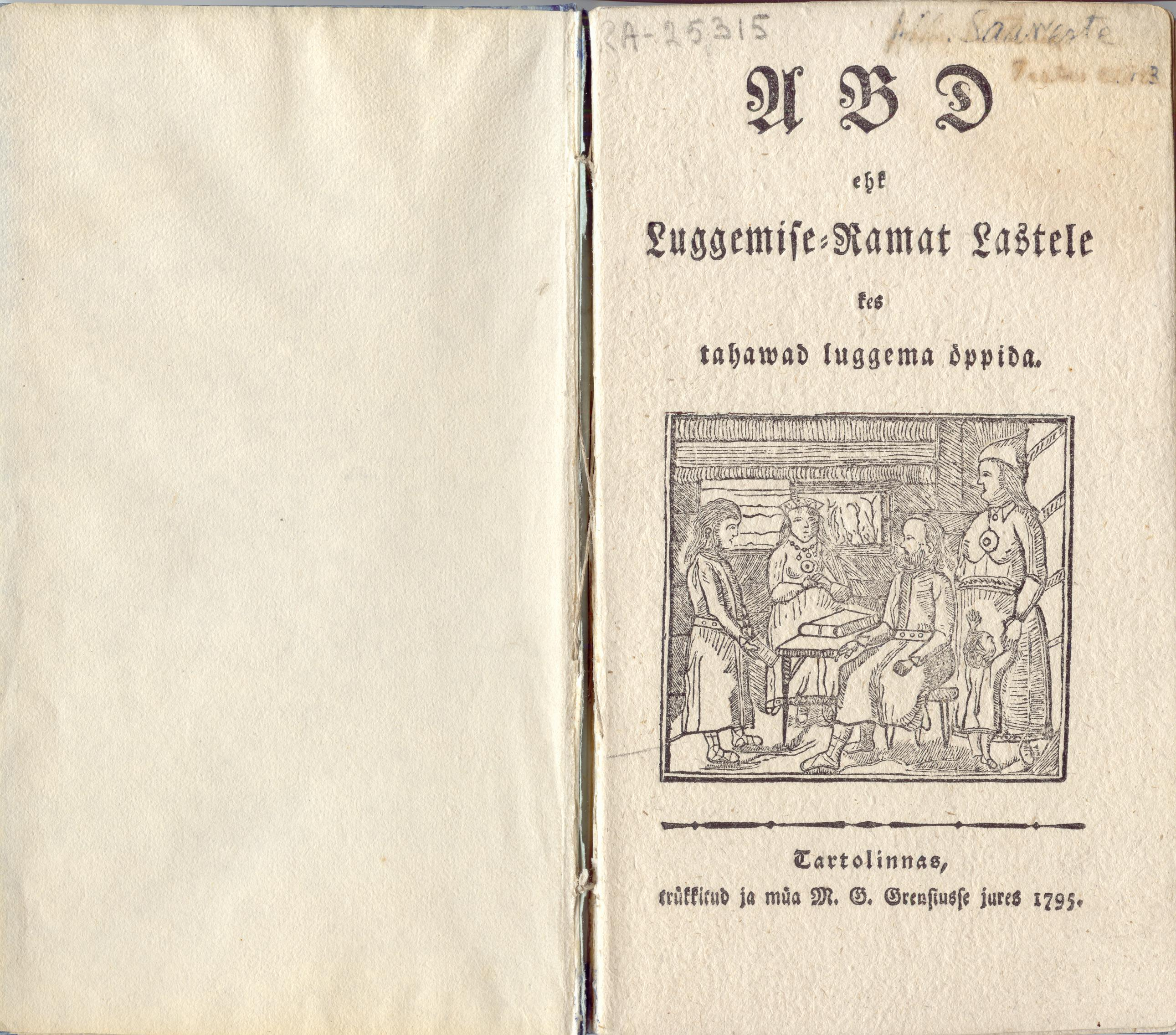
- Title page
- Author: Otto Wilhelm Masing
- Language: Estonian language
- Genre: Alphabet book
- Publication date: 1795
- Publication place: Estonia

ABD ehk Luggemise-Ramat Lastele ("ABD or the Reading Book for Children") is an Estonian language textbook written by Otto Wilhelm Masing and published in Tartu, Estonia in 1795.

ABD was the first Estonian alphabet book with a separate title page, and it also included a guide on how to teach reading. In Estonian, the abbreviation "ABC" is not used for the alphabet because the letter C does not appear in Estonian vocabulary.

== See also ==
- Estonian orthography
