= Goleši =

Goleši Голеши (Serbian)
- Village (Selo)
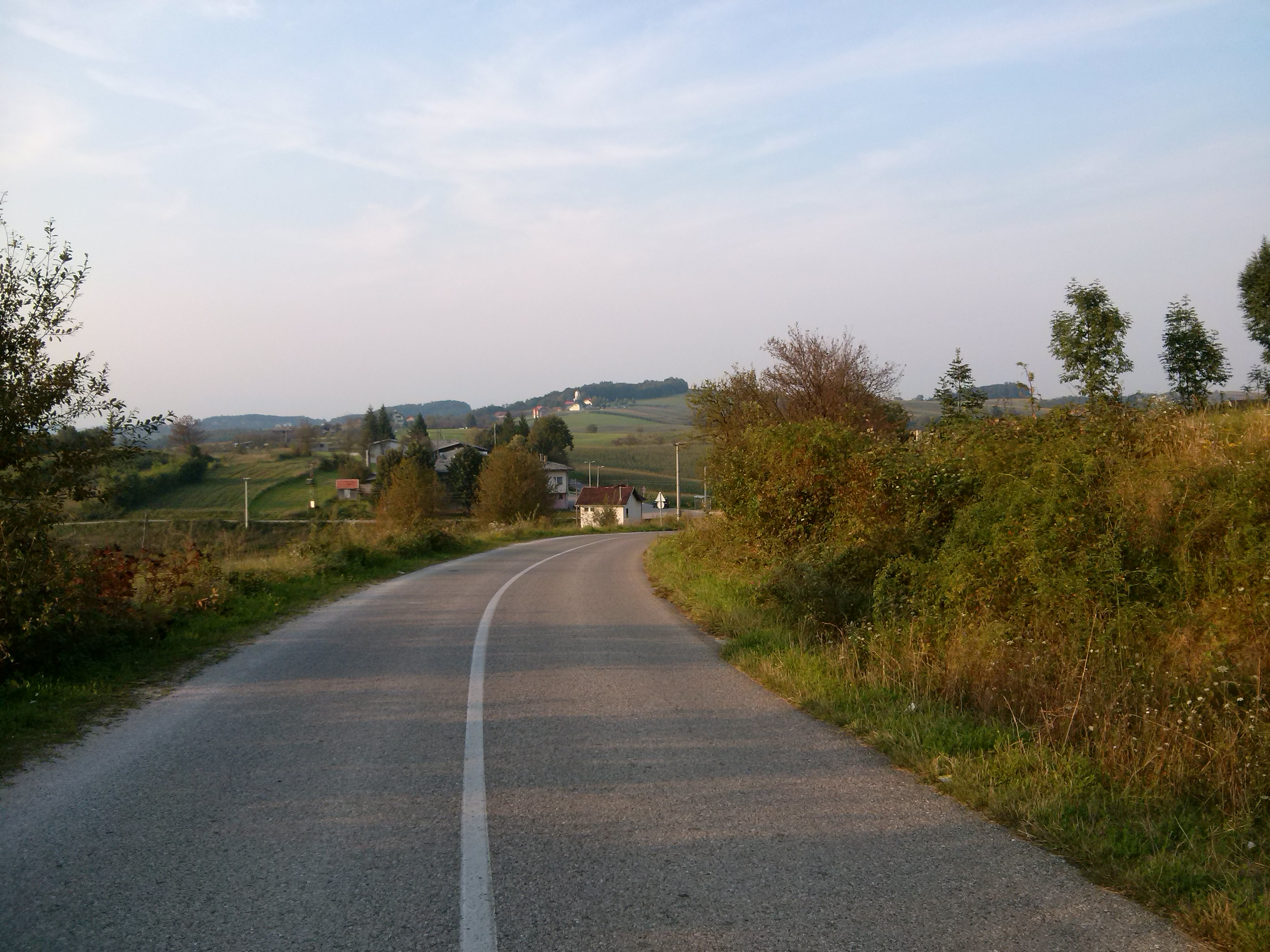

- Location within Bosnia and Herzegovina
- Coordinates: 44°45′34″N 17°04′22″E
- Country: Bosnia and Herzegovina
- Entity: Republika Srpska
- Municipality: Banja Luka

Population (2013)
  - Total: 384
- Time zone: UTC+1 (CET)
  - Summer (DST): UTC+2 (CEST)

Goleši (Serbian Cyrillic: Голеши) is a village in the municipality of Banja Luka, Republika Srpska, Bosnia and Herzegovina.
