= Vilusi, Estonia =

Village in Estonia

Coordinates: 58°53′N 26°57′E

Vilusi
- Village
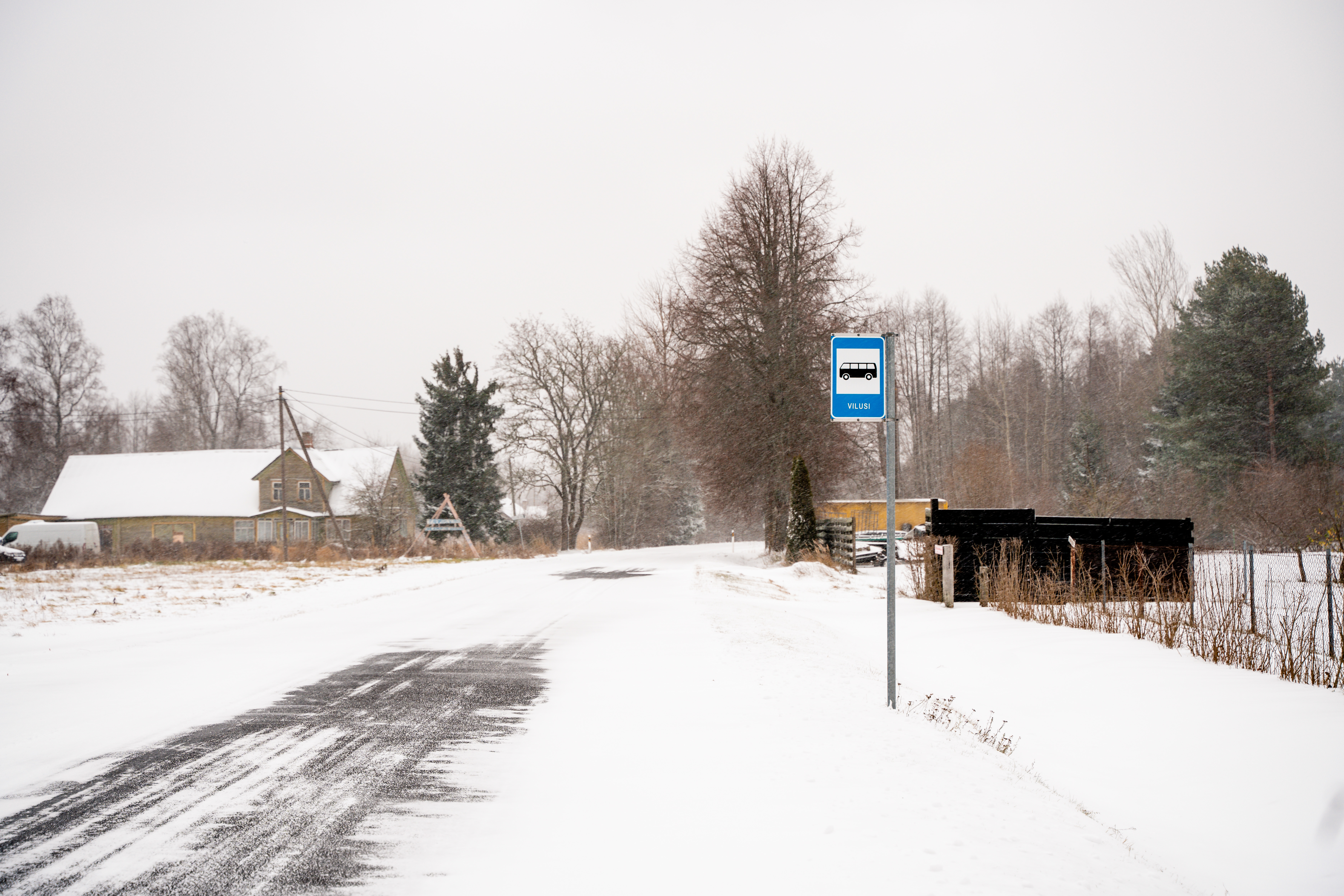
- Interactive map of Vilusi
- Country: Estonia
- County: Jõgeva County
- Parish: Mustvee Parish
- Time zone: UTC+2 (EET)
  - Summer (DST): UTC+3 (EEST)

Vilusi is a village in Mustvee Parish, Jõgeva County in northeastern Estonia. Before the 2017 administrative reform, it was located in Lohusuu Parish.
