= Otto Wilhelm Masing =

Estonian clergyman and linguist

Otto Wilhelm Masing

Otto Wilhelm Masing (8 November [O.S. 28 October] 1763 in Lohusuu, Kreis Dorpat – 15 March [O.S. 3 March] 1832 in Äksi, Kreis Dorpat, then Livland Governorate, now Estonia) was a clergyman, writer, journalist, linguist, notable early Estophile and a major advocate of Estonian commoners' rights, especially regarding education.

== Life ==
Masing was born in 1763 in the village of Lohusuu, Kreis Dorpat (then part of Russian Empire, now Estonia). His father Kristian Masick was a local ethnic Estonian Lutheran clergyman, and mother Anna Ludovica von Hildebrandt was a noblewoman of German descent.

Masing received schooling at the town school of Narva (1777–1779), and at the Gymnasium of Torgau (1779–1782) in Germany. He then studied theology, music and drawing at the University of Halle before returning to Estonia in 1786.

In 1796, Masing married Dorothea Amalie Ehlertz (1776–1809) in Tartu (Dorpat), a daughter of the city councillor Carl Ulrich Ehlertz (1739–1790) and his wife Louisa Dorothea née Stockenberg (1755–1803), a great-granddaughter of the sculptor Johann Gustav Stockenberg.

== Work ==
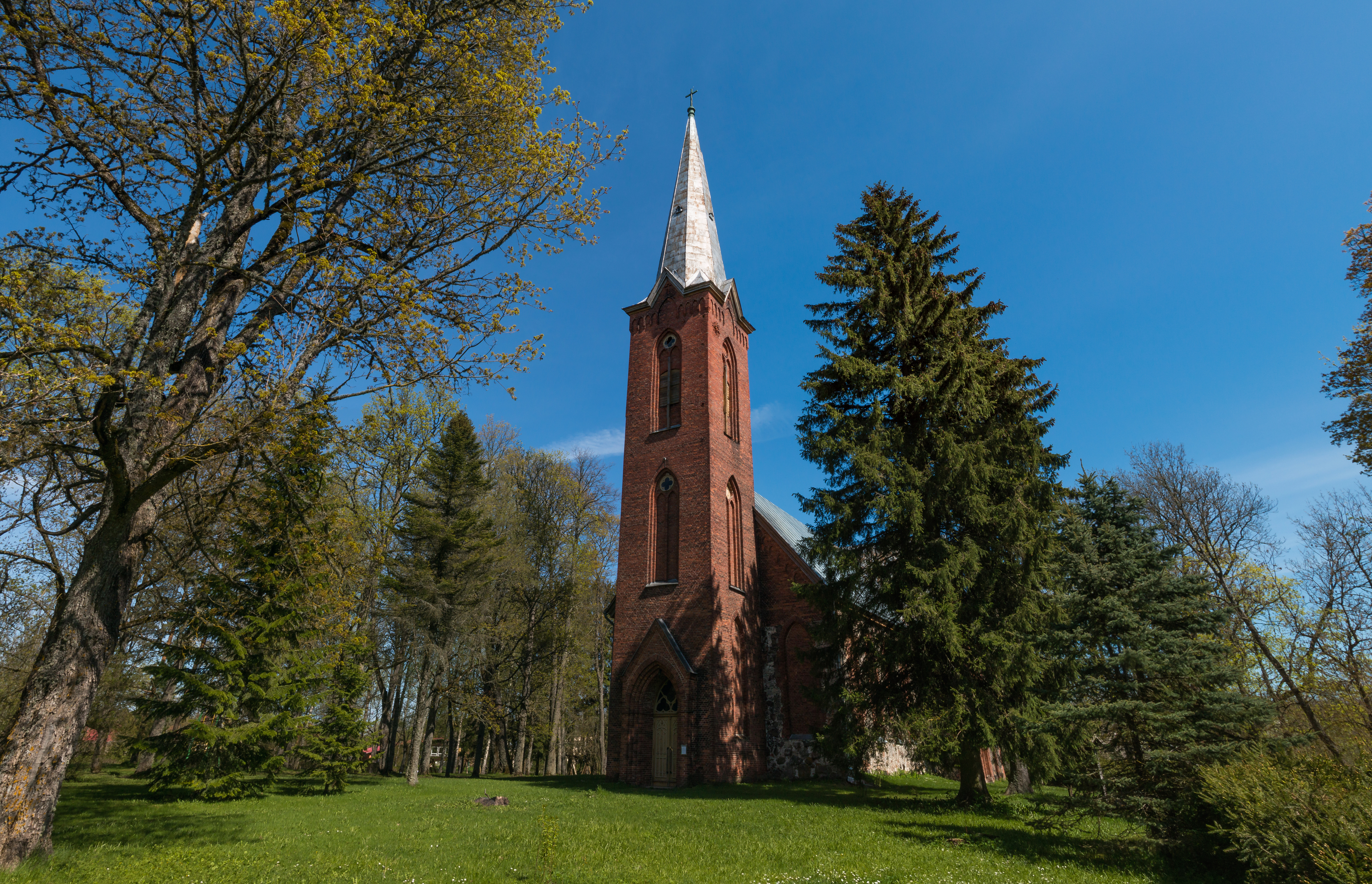
Church of St. Andrew in Äksi (2015)

Masing's first employment after concluding his studies was as private tutor at the manor in Püssi (Neu-Isenhof) for the children of the nobleman Otto Magnus von Toll.

In 1788, he became the pastor of the Lutheran church in Lüganuse (Luggenhusen), and then served from 1795 in Viru-Nigula (Maholm), and from 1815 in Äksi (Ecks), where he remained as pastor until his death.

From 1818 he also took on the post of assessor of the consistory of Livonia and from 1821 onwards he was also Provost for Tartu.

== Contributions as publicist and linguist ==
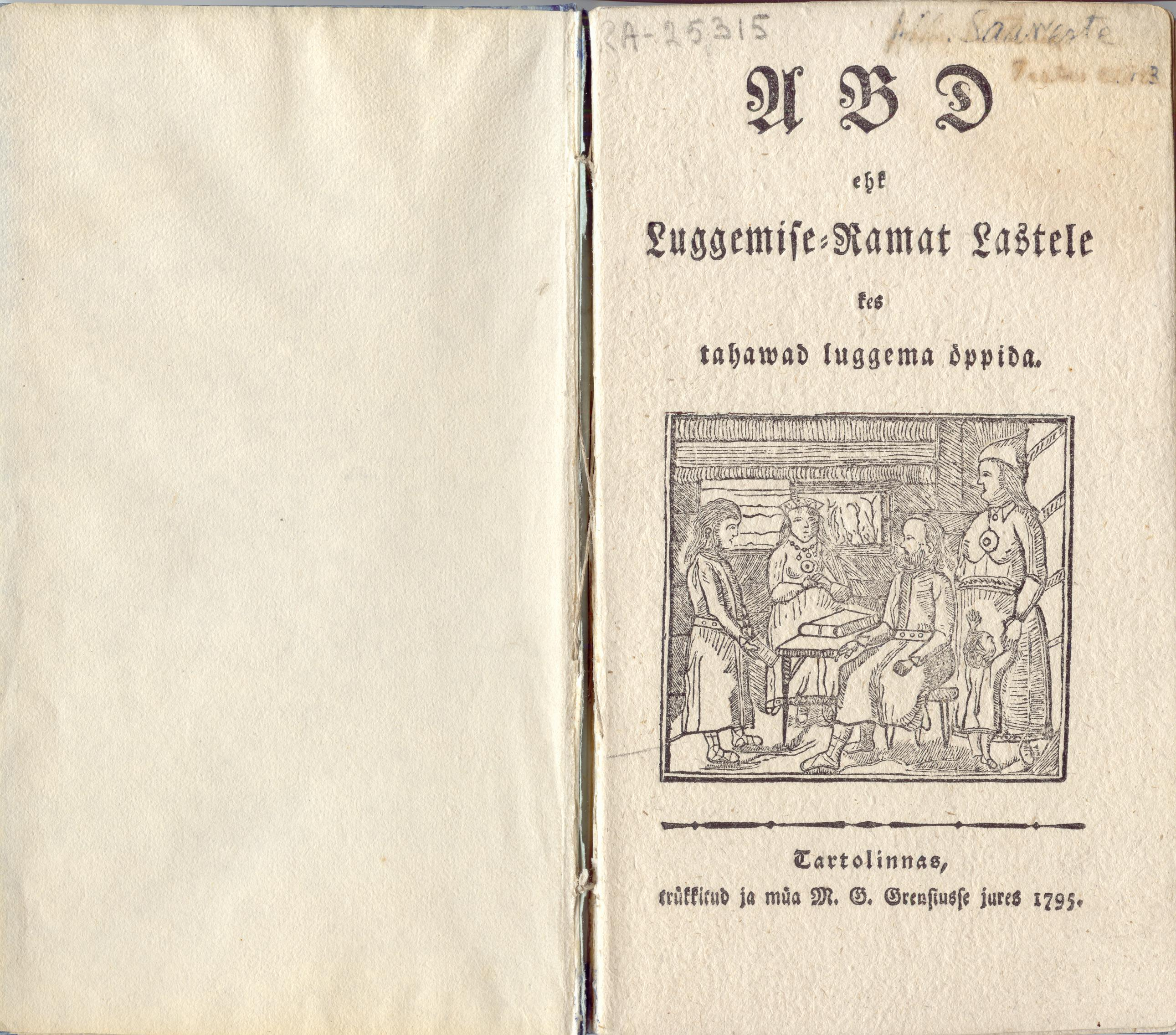
Title page of ABD by Otto Wilhelm Masing, published in 1795

In 1795, Masing compiled and published a children's textbook for learning reading, ABD. (The letter C does not appear in Estonian words, and back then, was not considered part of the Estonian alphabet. This considered, the title could be translated as ABC.) He published a further textbook with methodical reading instructions, Luggemislehhed, in 1821.

In 1821–1823, and in 1825, Masing published the newspaper Marahwa Näddala-Leht (Estonian for 'Rural People's Weekly'), one of the earliest periodicals in Estonian.

Among other linguistic contributions, Masing is credited with creating the letter õ to denote an Estonian phoneme not found in other related languages.

== Honours ==
- Imperial Russian Order of Saint Vladimir, 4th class (awarded 1821)
