= Tammispää =

Village in Estonia

Coordinates: 58°55′22″N 26°59′55″E

- Village
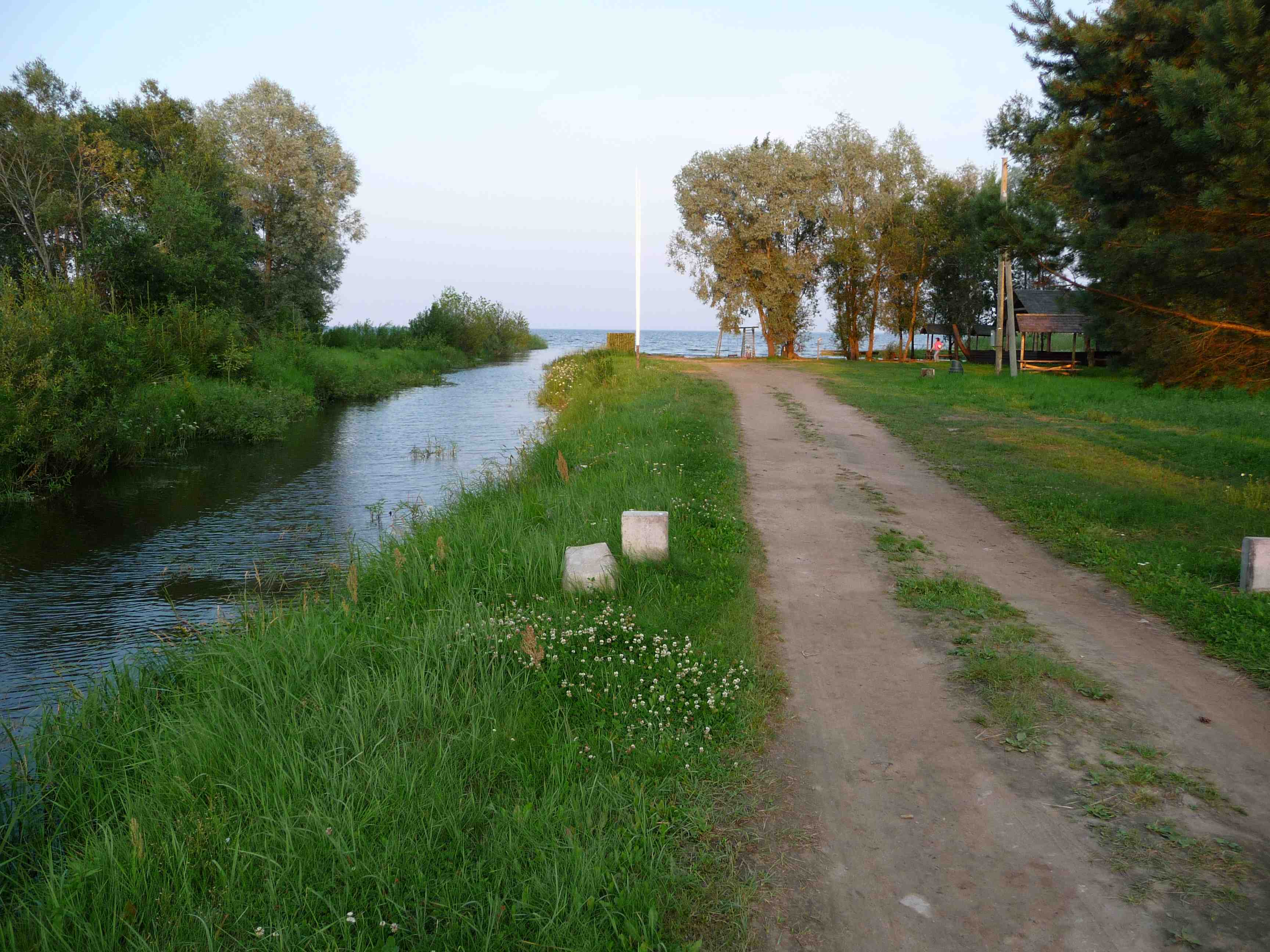
- Canal in Tammispää to Lake Peipus
- Interactive map of Tammispää
- Country: Estonia
- County: Jõgeva County
- Parish: Mustvee Parish
- Time zone: UTC+2 (EET)
  - Summer (DST): UTC+3 (EEST)

Tammispää is a village in Mustvee Parish, Jõgeva County in northeastern Estonia. Before the 2017 administrative reform, it was located in Lohusuu Parish.
