= Sasina, Sanski Most =

Sasina Сасина
- Village
- Location within Bosnia and Herzegovina
- Coordinates: 44°48′19″N 16°44′8″E
- Country: Bosnia and Herzegovina
- Entity: Federation of Bosnia and Herzegovina
- Canton: Una-Sana
- Municipality: Sanski Most

Area
  - Total: 6.10 sq mi (15.79 km^{2})

Population (2013)
  - Total: 294
  - Density: 48.2/sq mi (18.6/km^{2})
- Time zone: UTC+1 (CET)
  - Summer (DST): UTC+2 (CEST)

Sasina (Serbian Cyrillic: Сасина) is a village in the municipality of Sanski Most, Federation of Bosnia and Herzegovina, Bosnia and Herzegovina.

== Demographics ==
According to the 2013 census, its population was 294.

Ethnicity in 2013
Ethnicity	Number	Percentage
Croats	250	85.0%
Bosniaks	32	10.9%
other/undeclared	12	4.1%
Total	294	100%
