= Piilsi =

Village in Estonia

Coordinates: 58°55′N 26°56′E

- Village
- Interactive map of Piilsi
- Country: Estonia
- County: Jõgeva County
- Parish: Mustvee Parish
- Time zone: UTC+2 (EET)
  - Summer (DST): UTC+3 (EEST)

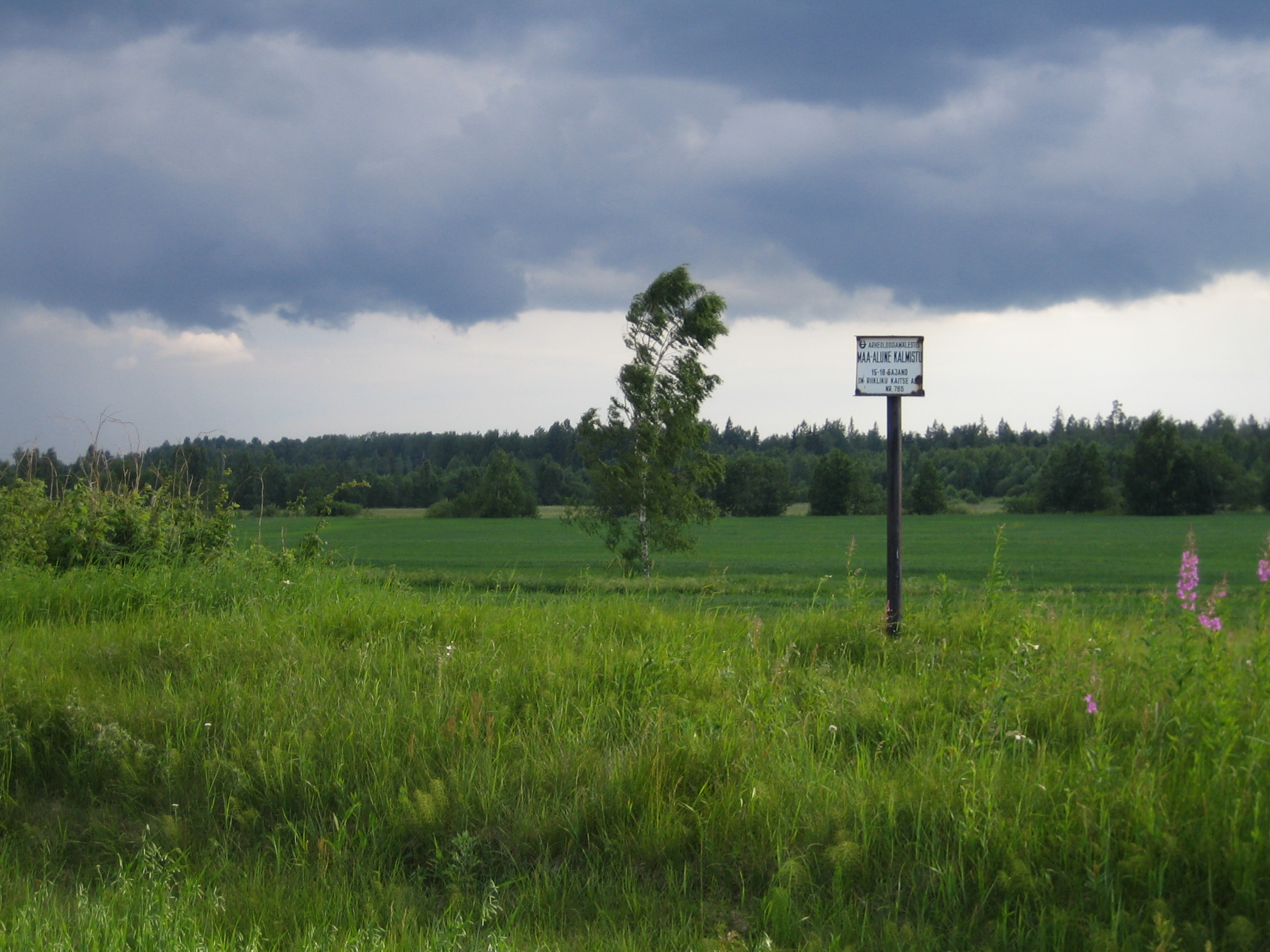
Underground cemetery in Piilsi

Piilsi is a village in Mustvee Parish, Jõgeva County in northeastern Estonia. Before the 2017 administrative reform, it was located in Lohusuu Parish.
