= Vilusi, Banja Luka =

Vilusi Вилуси (Serbian)
- Village (Selo)
- Location within Bosnia and Herzegovina
- Coordinates: 44°41′15″N 16°54′14″E
- Country: Bosnia and Herzegovina
- Entity: Republika Srpska
- Municipality: Banja Luka

Population (2013)
  - Total: 135
- Time zone: UTC+1 (CET)
  - Summer (DST): UTC+2 (CEST)

Vilusi (Serbian Cyrillic: Вилуси) is a village in the municipality of Banja Luka, Republika Srpska, Bosnia and Herzegovina.
