= Soitsjärv =

Lake in Estonia

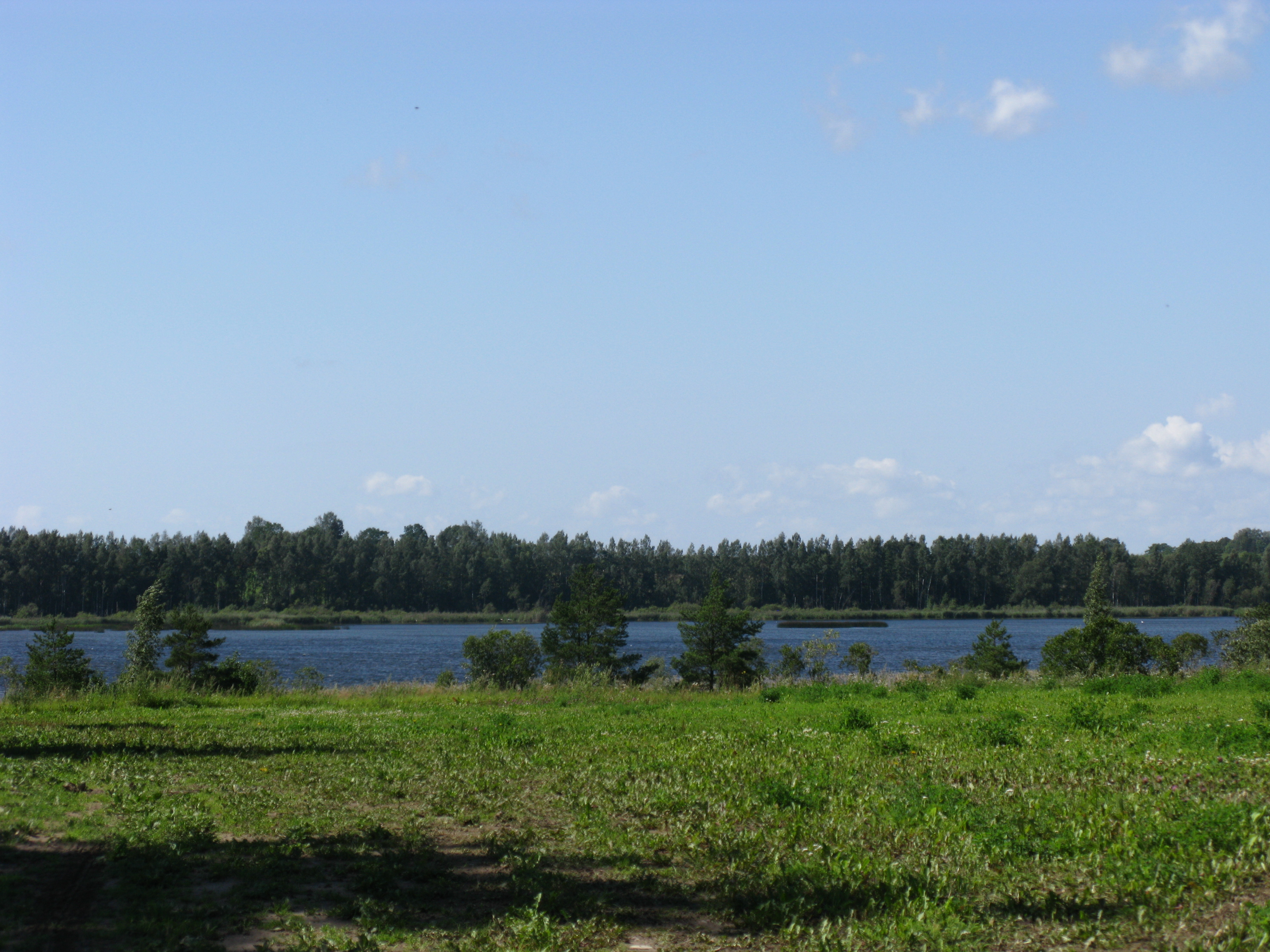

- Location within Estonia
- Coordinates: 58.5553°N 26.6856°E
- Basin countries: Estonia
- Max. length: 4,120 meters (13,520 ft)
- Surface area: 158.2 hectares (391 acres)
- Average depth: 1.3 meters (4 ft 3 in)
- Max. depth: 8.0 meters (26.2 ft)
- Water volume: 2,922,000 cubic meters (103,200,000 cu ft)
- Shore length^{1}: 10,760 meters (35,300 ft)
- Surface elevation: 53.5 meters (176 ft)
- ^{1} Shore length is not a well-defined measure.

Soitsjärv is a lake in Estonia. It is located in the villages of Elistvere, Juula, Soitsjärve, and Valgma in Tartu Parish, Tartu County.

== Physical description ==
The lake has an area of 158.2 hectares (391 acres). The lake has an average depth of 1.3 meters (4 ft 3 in) and a maximum depth of 8.0 meters (26.2 ft). It is 4,120 meters (13,520 ft) long, and its shoreline measures 10,760 meters (35,300 ft). It has a volume of 2,922,000 cubic meters (103,200,000 cu ft).

== See also ==
- List of lakes of Estonia
