= Jogentagana =

Ancient county of Estonia

- county of Ancient Estonia
- 9th Century–1224
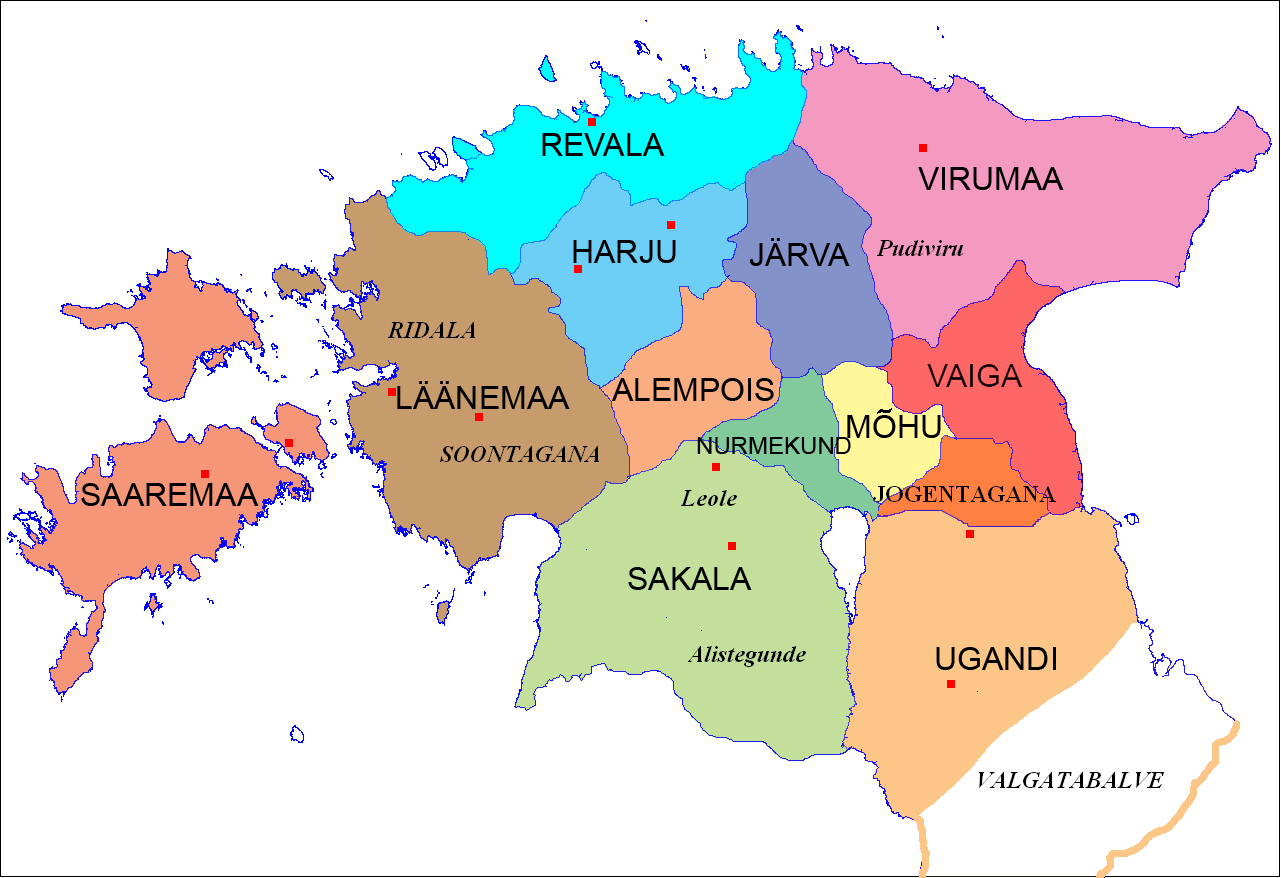
- Ancient Estonian counties
- Area
  - Coordinates: 58°30′N 26°30′E
  - Type: Council of Elders
- History
  - Established: 9th Century
  - Livonian Crusade: 1224
Succeeded by
Monastic state of the Teutonic Knights

Jogentagana (Latin: Jogentagania) was a small landlocked ancient Estonian county in the eastern part of the territory of Estonia. It was conquered by the Teutonic Order in the Estonian Crusade and became part of the Livonian Order.

== Settlements ==
- Igeteveri
- Kavastu
- Kärkna
- Maarja-Magdaleena
- Äksi

== See also ==
- Livonian Crusade
