= Saadjärv =

Lake in Estonia

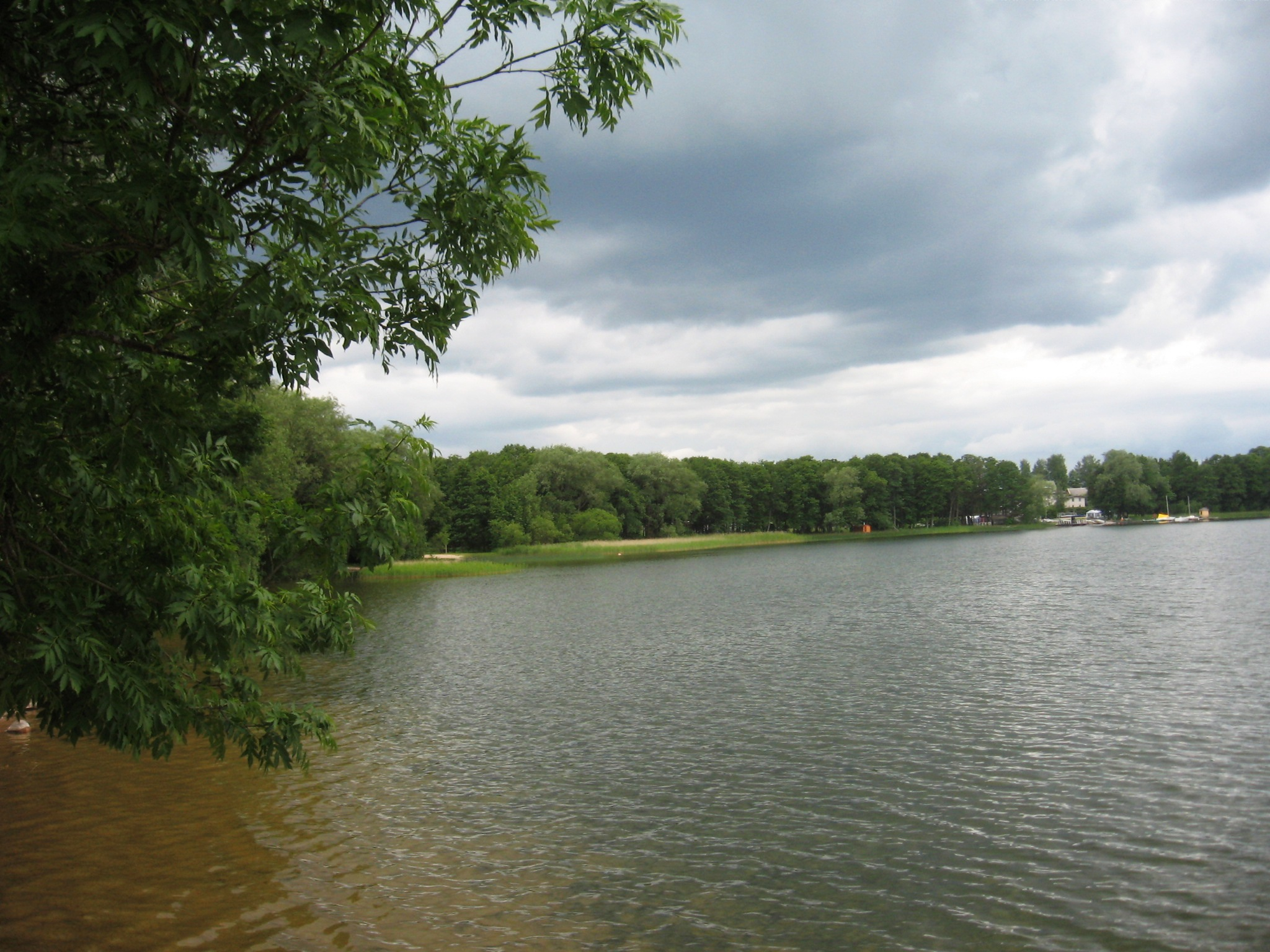

- Location within Estonia
- Location: Estonia
- Coordinates: 58°32′N 26°40′E
- Primary outflows: Mudajõgi
- Basin countries: Estonia
- Max. length: 6,390 meters (20,960 ft)
- Max. width: 1,800 meters (5,900 ft)
- Surface area: 723.3 hectares (1,787 acres)
- Average depth: {7.4 meters (24 ft)
- Max. depth: 25.0 meters (82.0 ft)
- Water volume: 53,442,000 cubic meters (1.8873×10^{9} cu ft)
- Shore length^{1}: 17,990 meters (59,020 ft)
- Surface elevation: {52.5 meters (172 ft)
- Settlements: Tabivere, Äksi
- ^{1} Shore length is not a well-defined measure.

Saadjärv is a lake in east-central Estonia. It is located in the settlements of Äksi, Kukulinna, Saadjärve, Tabivere, Voldi, and Valgma in Tartu Parish, Tartu County.

== Physical description ==
The lake has an area of 723.3 hectares (1,787 acres). The lake has an average depth of 7.4 meters (24 ft) and a maximum depth of 25.0 meters (82.0 ft). It is 6,390 meters (20,960 ft) long, and its shoreline measures 17,990 meters (59,020 ft). It has a volume of 53,442,000 cubic meters (1.8873×10^{9} cu ft).

== Trivia ==
This lake is referenced in Canto VIII of the epic "The Hero of Estonia" by William Forsell Kirby.

== See also ==
- List of lakes in Estonia
