= Tammistu =

Tammistu may refer to several places in Estonia:

- Tammistu, Harju County, village in Kuusalu Parish, Harju County
- Tammistu, Hiiu County, village in Hiiu Parish, Hiiu County
- Tammistu, Tartu County, village in Tartu Parish, Tartu County
