= Salu =

Salu may refer to:

== People ==
- Salu, the father of biblical prince Zimri
- Tina Salu, New Zealand female footballer
- Salu, the name of two notable chiefs of Anlo Afiadenyigba in Ghana
- Salu Digby, DC Comics character

== Places ==
- Salu, Harju County, Estonia
- Salu, Pärnu County, Estonia
- Salu, Saare County, Estonia
- Salu, Tartu County, Estonia
- Salu, Fars, Iran

== Other uses ==
- Salu (cloth), a type of cotton cloth in the Indian subcontinent

== See also ==
- Shalu Monastery, in Tibet
