= Nigula =

Nigula may refer to several places in Estonia:

- Nigula, Lääne County, village in Lääne-Nigula Parish, Lääne County
- Nigula, Tartu County, village in Tartu Parish, Tartu County
- Nigula Nature Reserve, in Pärnu County

== See also ==
- Viru-Nigula, small borough in Viru-Nigula Parish, Lääne-Viru County
