= Toolamaa =

Toolamaa may refer to several places in Estonia:

- Toolamaa, Põlva County, village in Räpina Parish, Põlva County
- Toolamaa, Tartu County, village in Tartu Parish, Tartu County
