= Tartu Parish =

Municipality of Estonia (2017)

Tartu Parish Tartu vald
- Municipality of Estonia
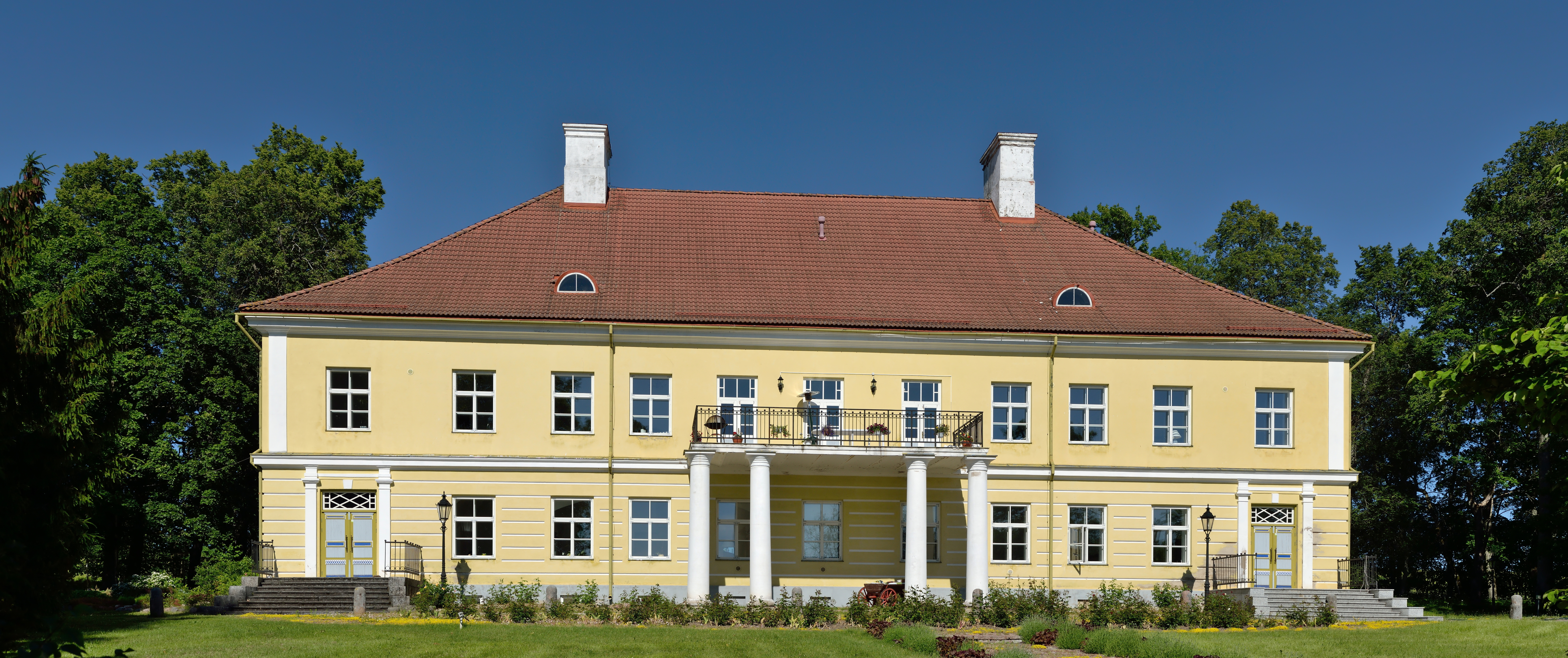
- Saadjärve manor

- Flag Coat of arms

- Tartu Parish within Tartu County
- Coordinates: 58°25′27″N 26°46′55″E
- Country: Estonia
- County: Tartu County
- Administrative centre: Kõrveküla

Government
  - Mayor: Aivar Soop

Area
  - Total: 742 km^{2} (286 sq mi)

Population (01.12.2022)
  - Total: 12,725
  - Density: 17.1/km^{2} (44.4/sq mi)
- ISO 3166 code: EE-796

Tartu Parish (Estonian: Tartu vald) is a rural municipality in Tartu County, Estonia. It has a population of 12,725 (as of 1 December 2022) and covers an area of 742 km^{2} (286 sq mi). The population density is 17.150/km^{2} (44.42/sq mi). It has one borough (Raadi), six small boroughs (Äksi, Kõrveküla, Lähte, Tabivere, Vahi and Vasula) and 70 villages. Since the 2017 administrative reform, the island of Piirissaar, located in Lake Peipus, is also administered as part of Tartu Parish.

== Settlements ==
Borough

Raadi

Small boroughs

Äksi - Kõrveküla - Lähte - Tabivere - Vahi - Vasula

Villages

Aovere - Arupää - Elistvere - Erala - Haava - Igavere - Jõusa - Juula - Kaiavere - Kaitsemõisa - Kämara - Kärevere - Kärkna - Kärksi - Kassema - Kastli - Kikivere - Kobratu - Kõduküla - Koogi - Kõnnujõe - Kõrenduse - Kükitaja - Kukulinna - Laeva - Lammiku - Lilu - Lombi - Maarja-Magdaleena - Maramaa - Metsanuka - Möllatsi - Nigula - Nõela - Otslava - Õvanurme - Õvi - Pataste - Piiri - Puhtaleiva - Pupastvere - Raigastvere - Reinu - Saadjärve - Saare - Salu - Sepa - Siniküla - Soeküla - Soitsjärve - Sojamaa - Sootaga - Taabri - Tammistu - Tila - Toolamaa - Tooni - Tormi - Uhmardu - Väägvere - Väänikvere - Valgma - Valmaotsa - Vedu - Vesneri - Viidike - Vilussaare - Võibla - Voldi

== Religion ==
In the 2021 census, measuring data from those aged 15 and over in the parish, 8.5 per cent declared themselves Lutheran, 3.2 per cent declared themselves Orthodox (including Old Believers), and 1.6 per cent as other Christian denominations. 84.6 per cent declared themselves religiously unaffiliated. 2.1 per cent of the population followed other religions or had unknown affiliation.

== Geography ==
Lakes

- Saadjärv
- Soitsjärv

== Gallery ==
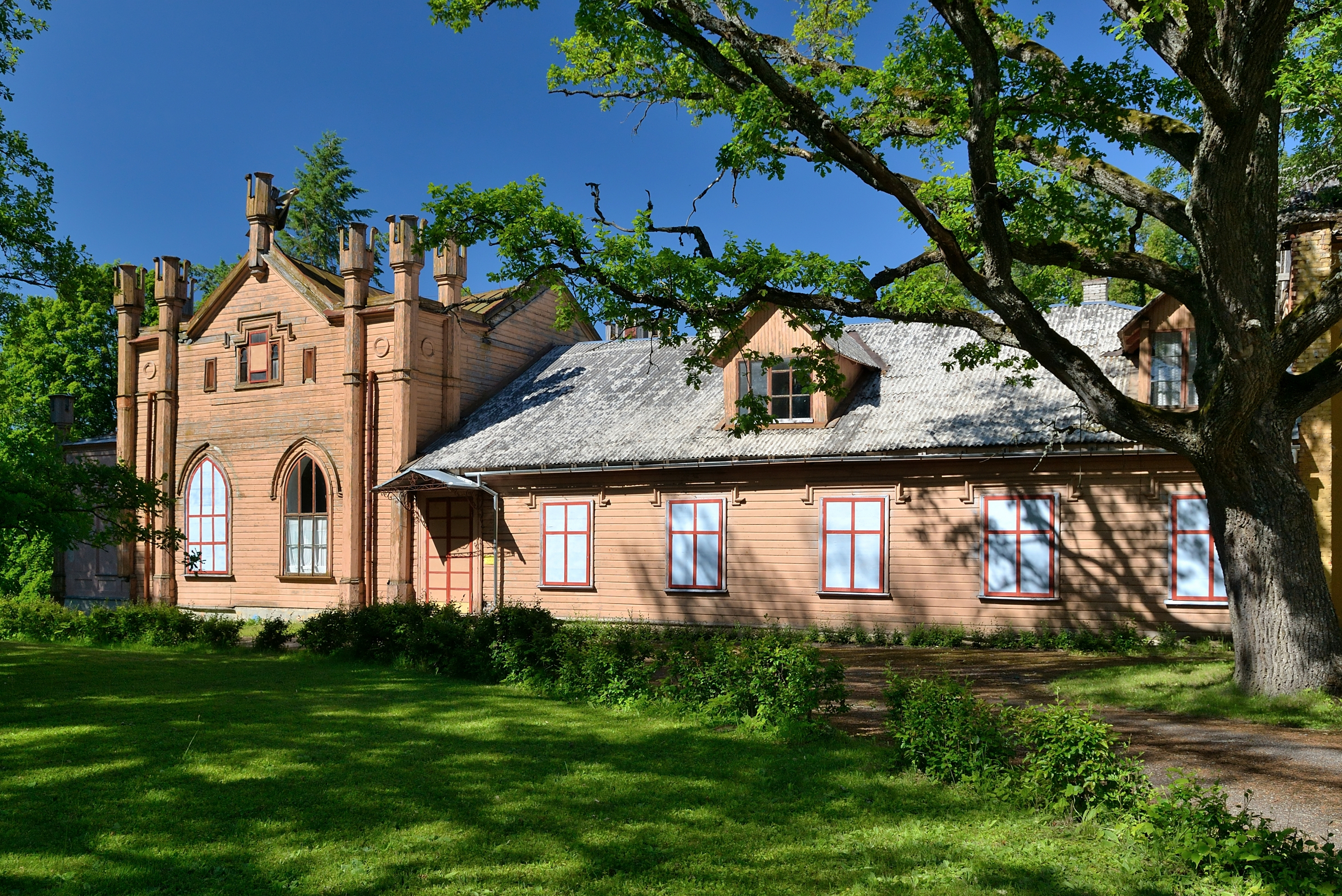
Kukulinna Manor

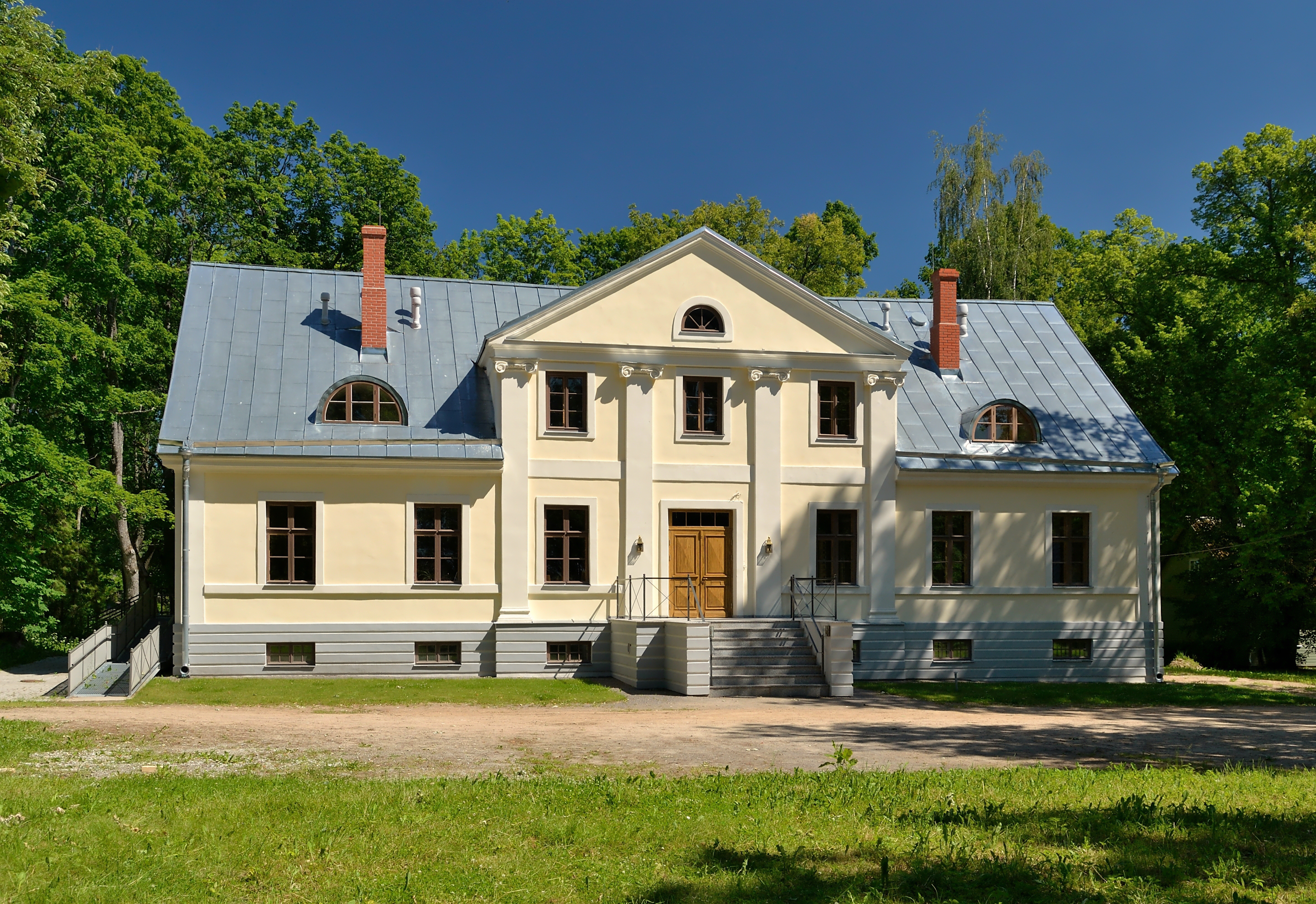
Tammistu Manor

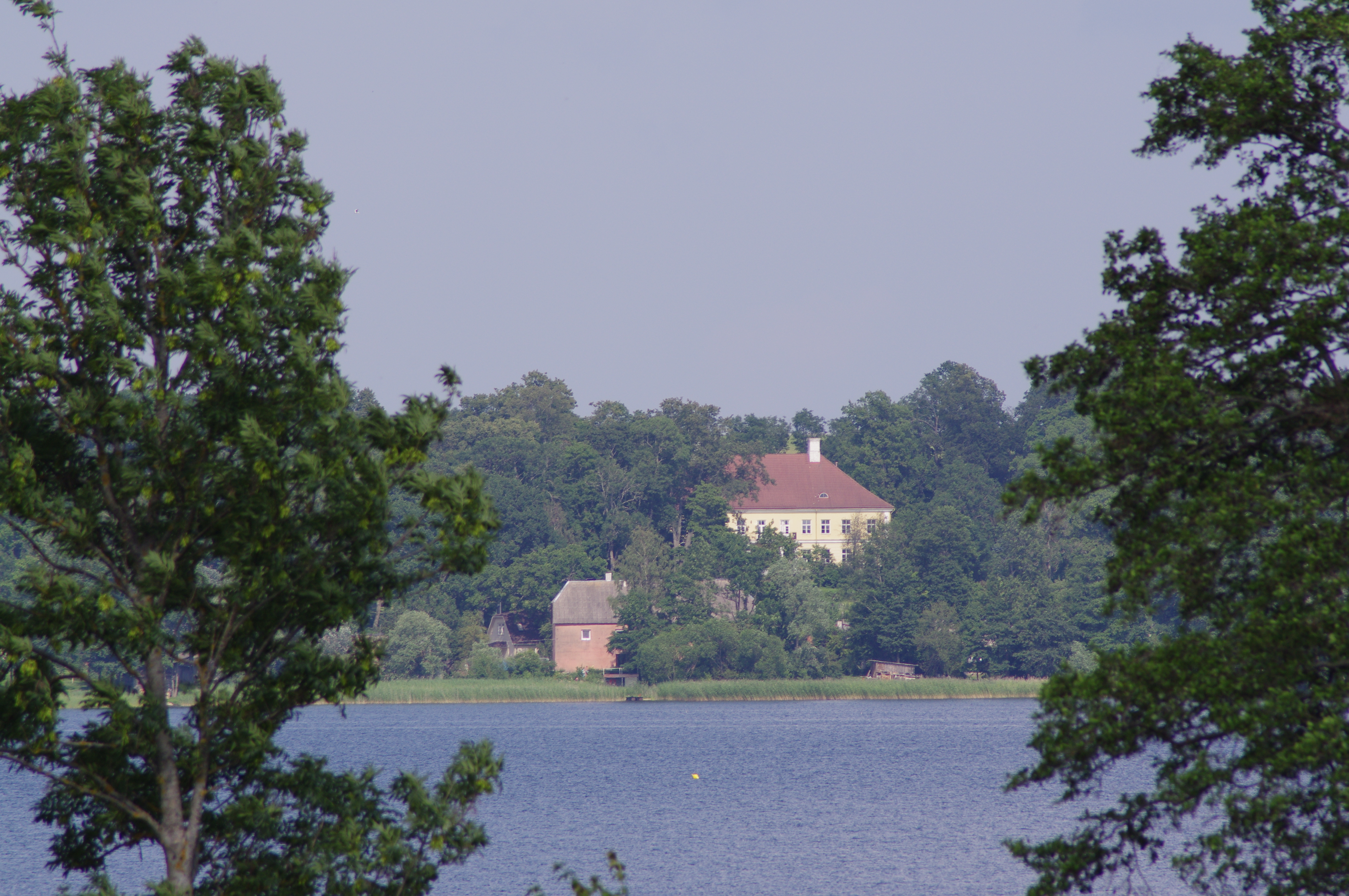
Saadjärve Manor and the Lake Saadjärv

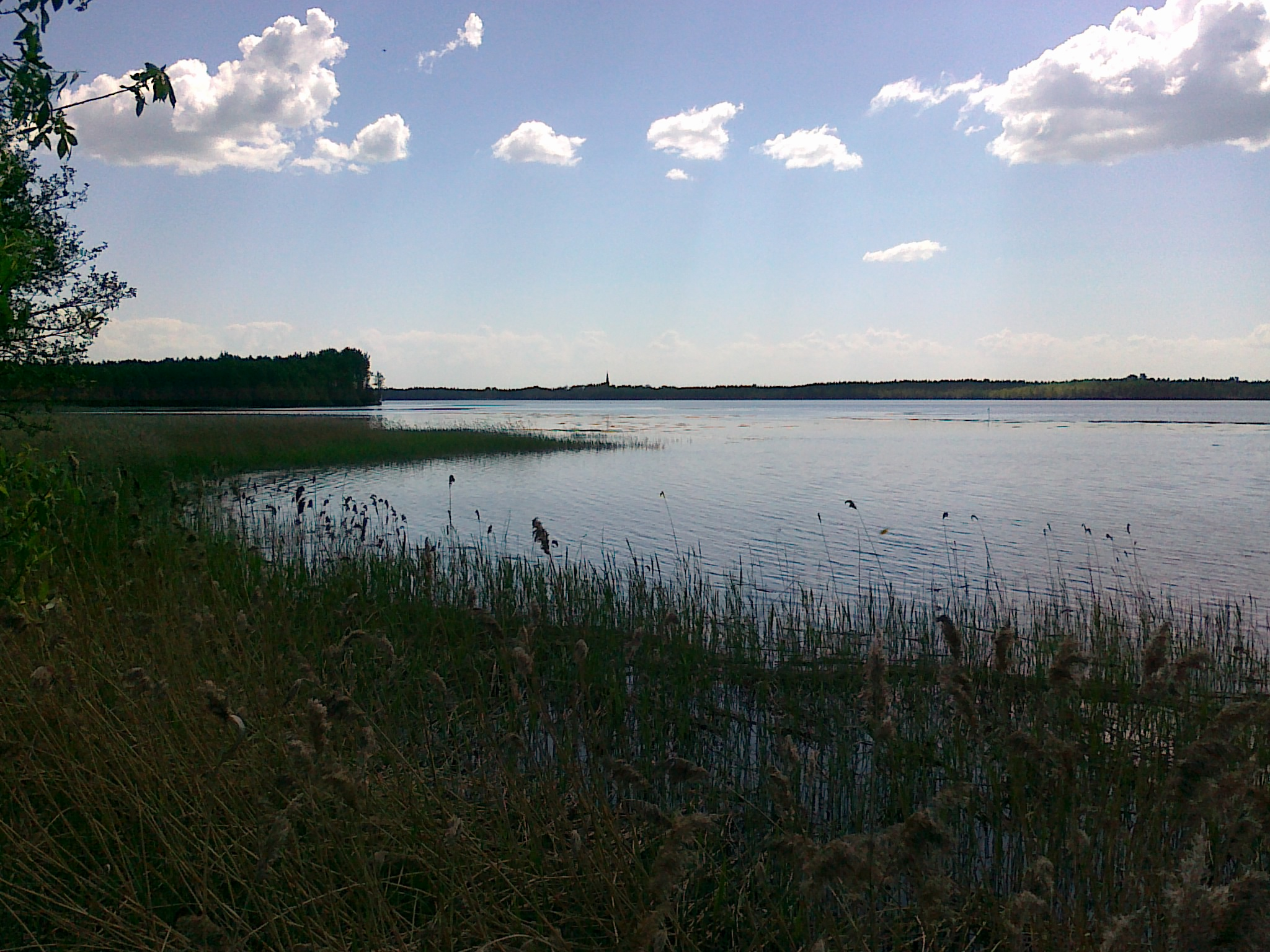
Lake Saadjärv

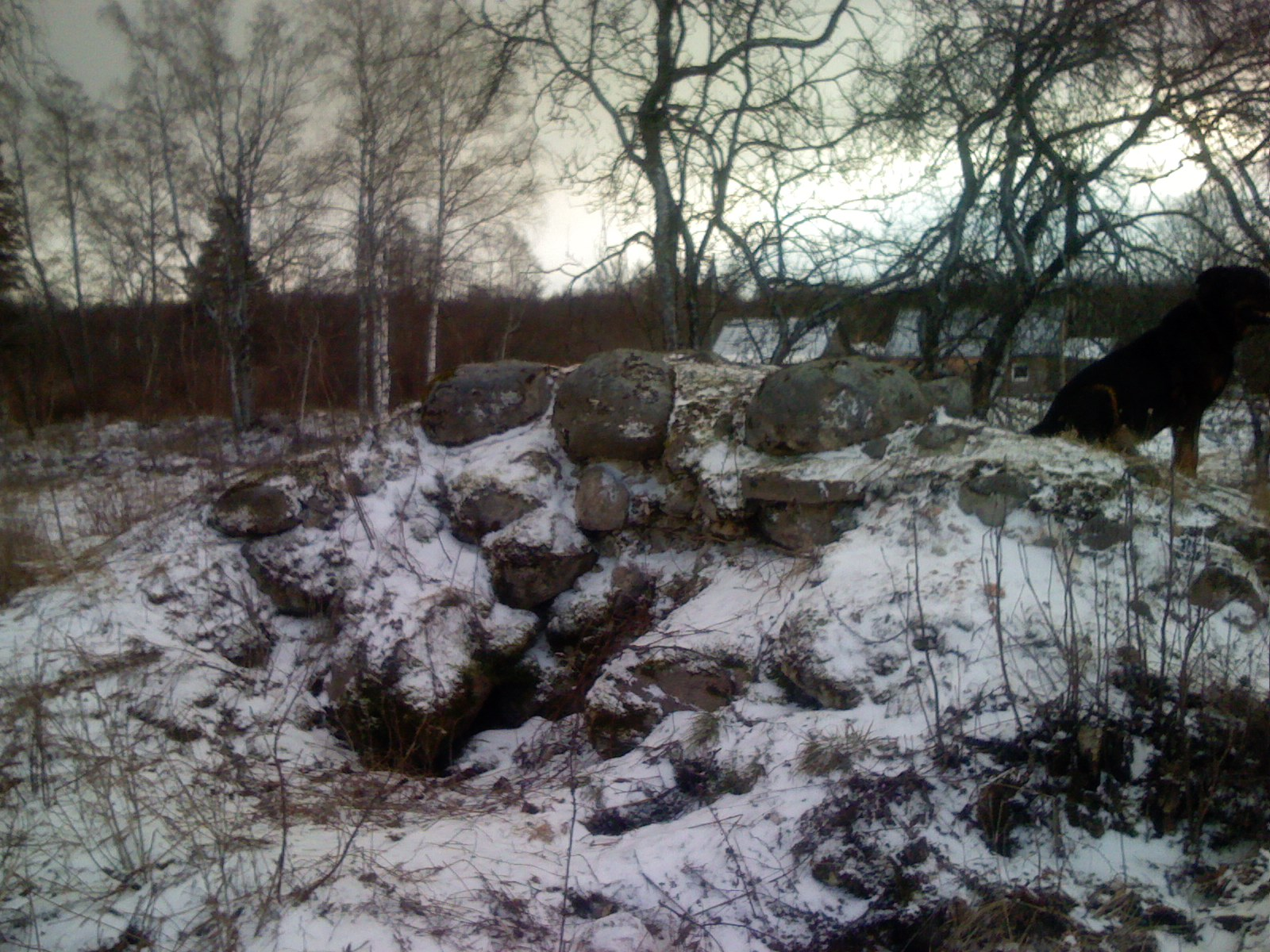
The ruins of Kärkna Abbey

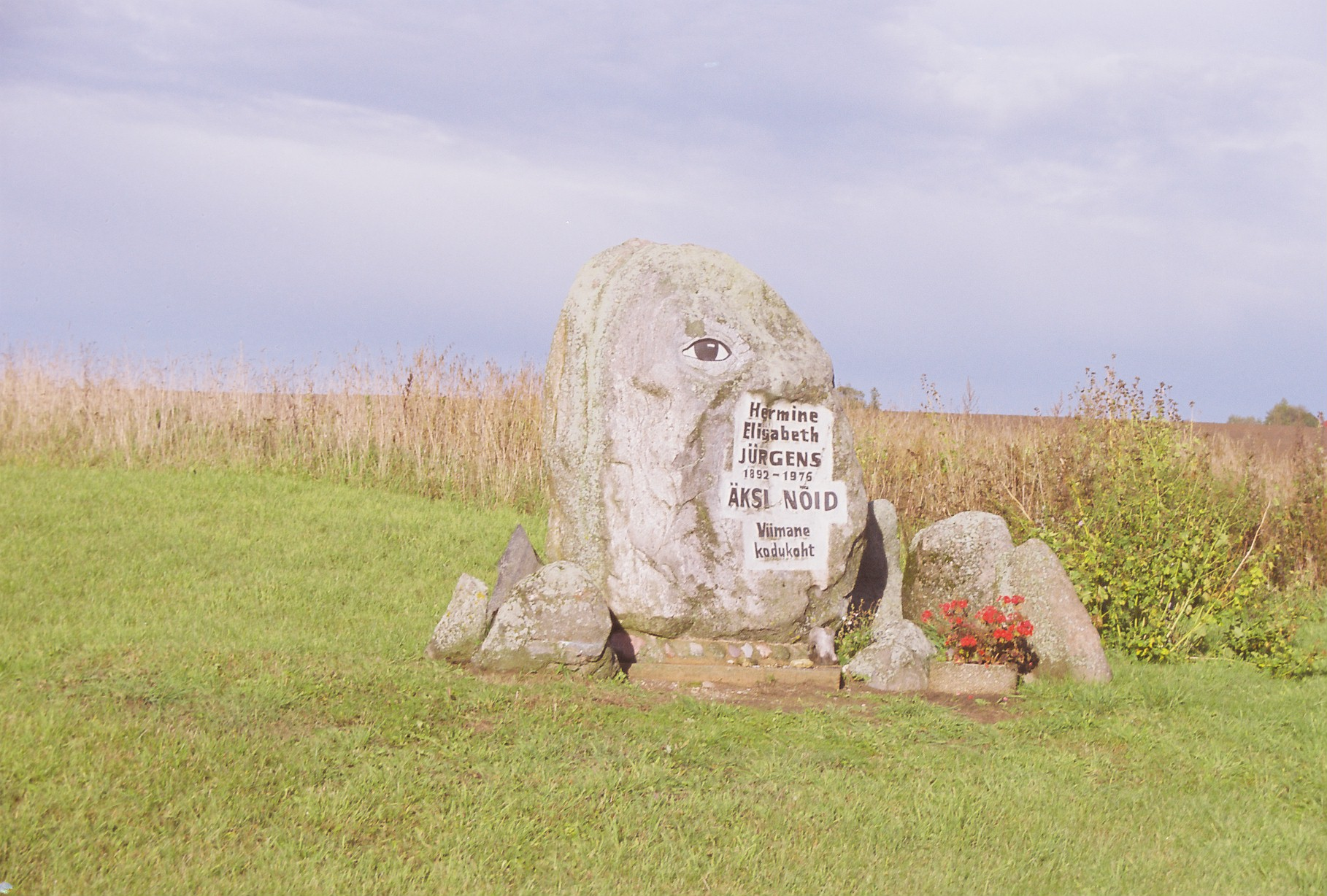
Memorial to "Witch of Äksi", Hermine Elisabeth Jürgens in Puhtaleiva

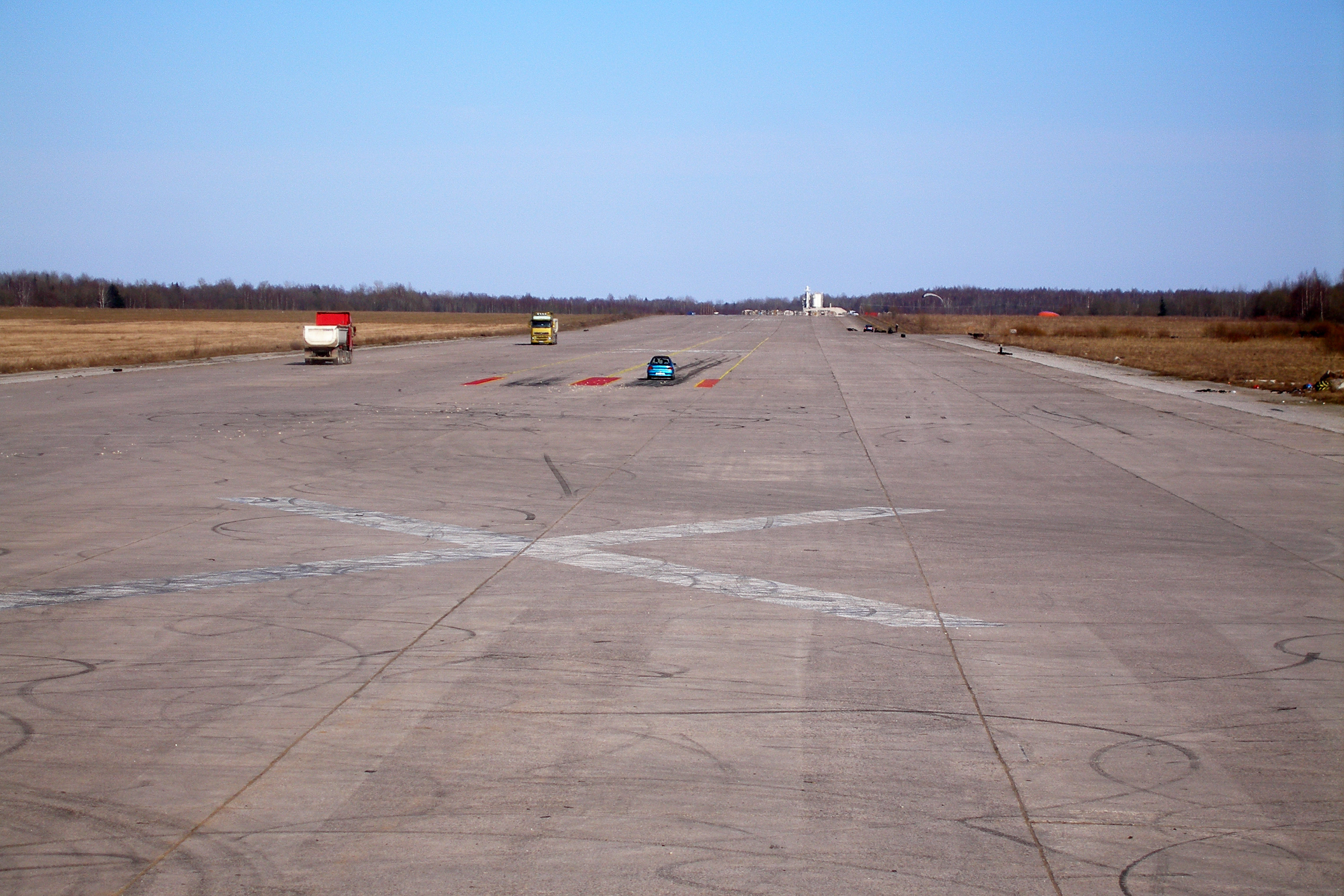
The main runway of the abandoned Raadi Airfield

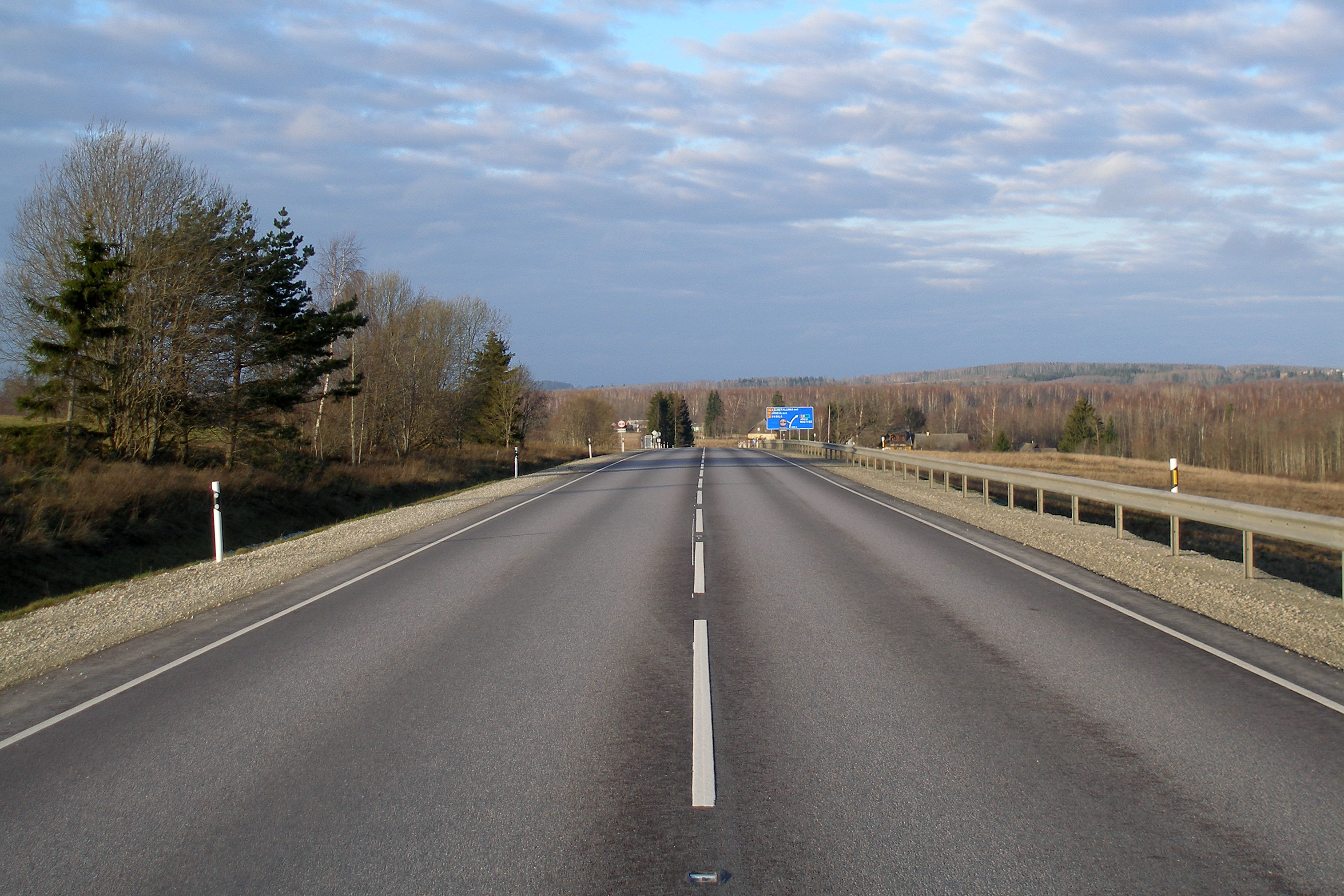
The Jõhvi–Tartu road (E264) near Aovere

== See also ==
- Kärkna Abbey
- Ice Age Centre
- Raadi Airfield

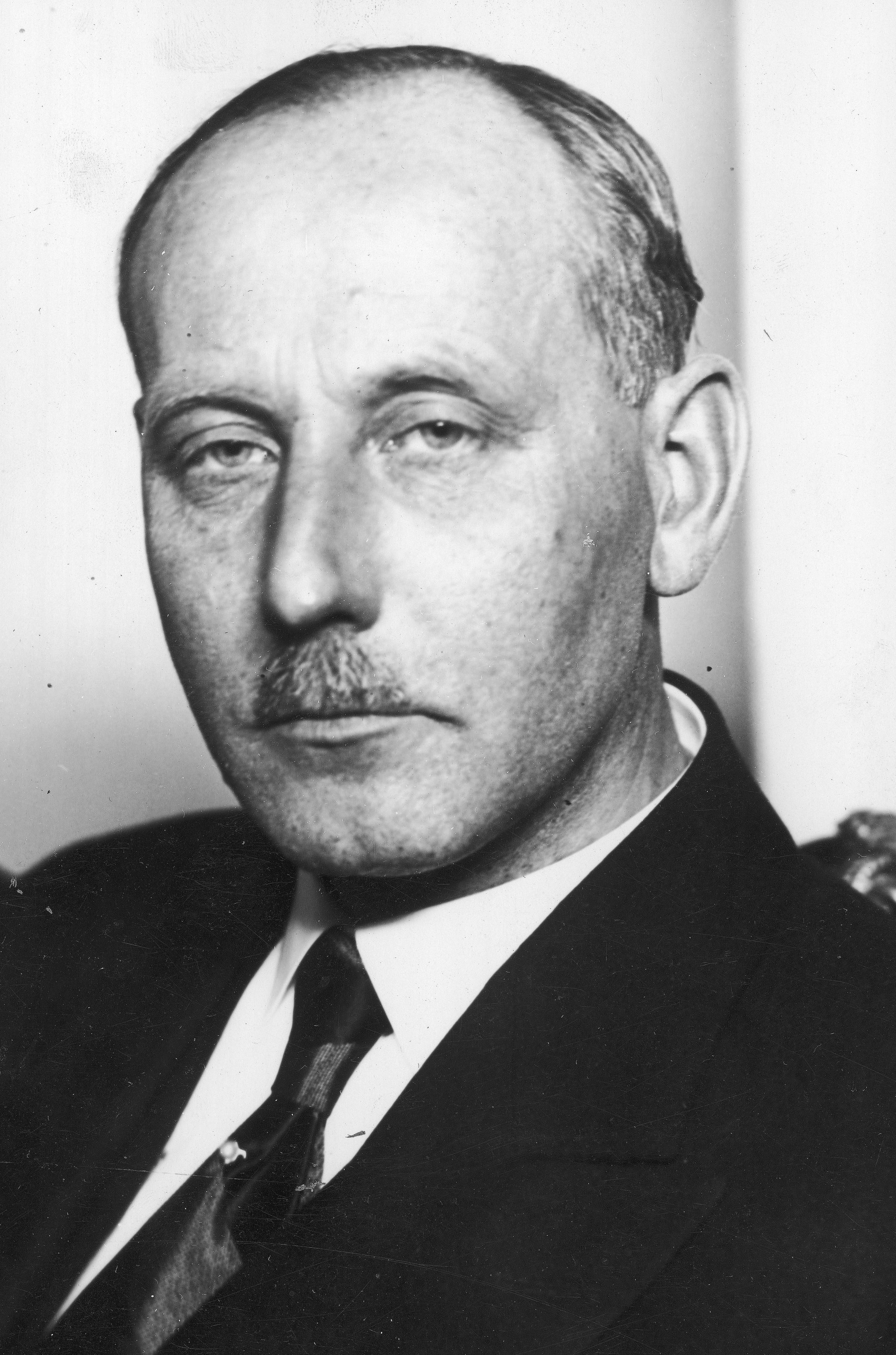
Kaarel Eenpalu, 1934

== Notable people ==
- Miina Härma (1864 in Kõrveküla – 1941), composer, organist, choir director and music teacher
- Amalie Konsa (1873 in Raadi Parish – 1949), stage actress and singer
- Mait Metsanurk (born 1879 in Metsanuka – 1957), writer who led the neo-realist school of Estonian literature.
- Jaan Koort (1883 in Äksi – 1935), sculptor, painter and ceramicist.
- Kaarel Eenpalu (1888 in Vesneri – 1942), journalist, politician and head of state, 7th Prime Minister of Estonia in 1938.
- Karl Kõiv (1894 in Sootaga – 1974), featherweight weightlifter, came seventh at the 1920 Summer Olympics
- Aavo Mölder (born 1944 in Vasula), agricultural scientist and politician; Ministry of Regional Affairs and Agriculture in 1992
