= Lähte =

Borough in Estonia

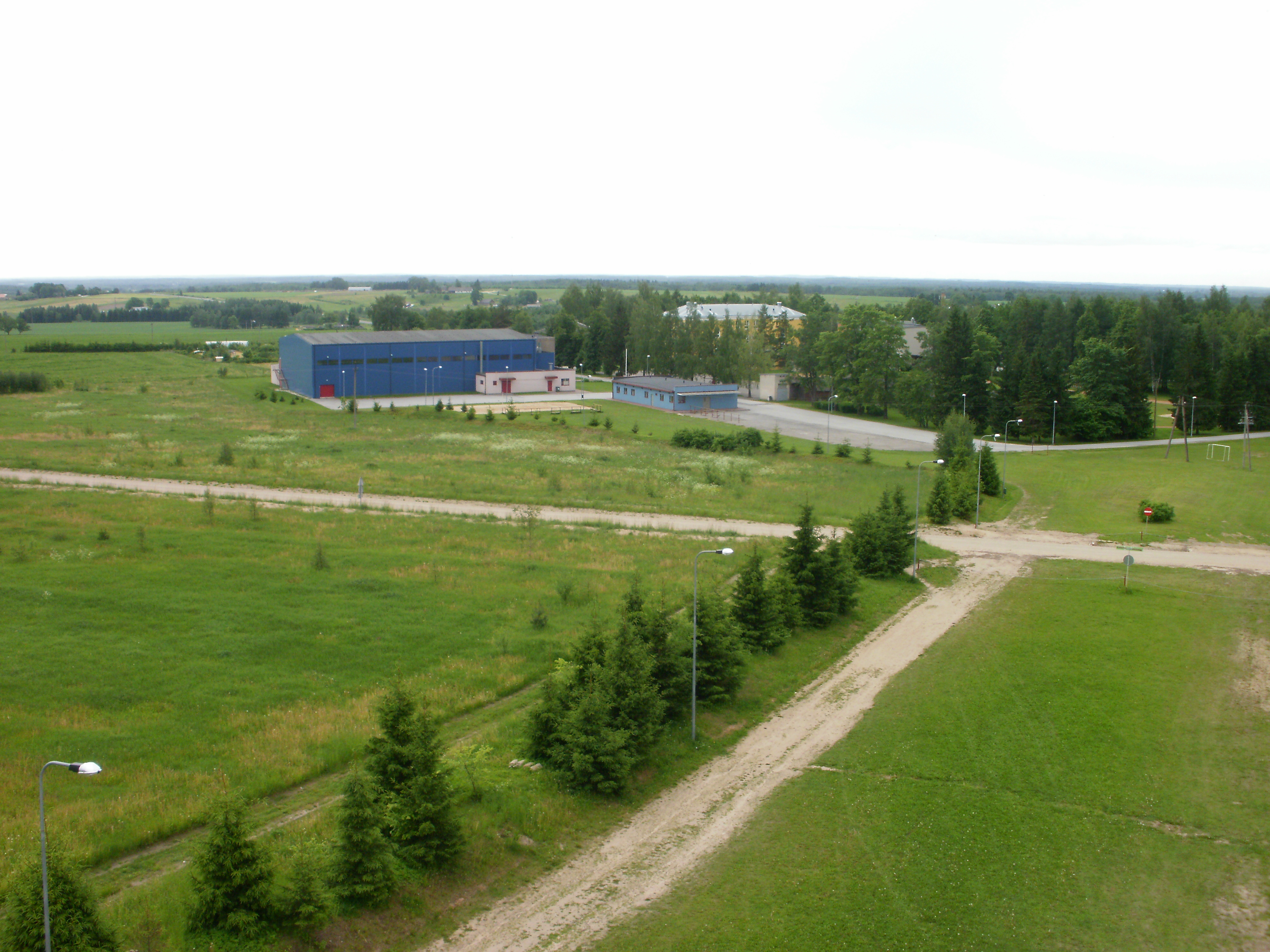
- Lähte sports building

- Location within Estonia
- Coordinates: 58°29′21″N 26°40′13″E
- Country: Estonia
- County: Tartu County
- Parish: Tartu Parish

Population (2011 Census)
  - Total: 492
- Time zone: UTC+2 (EET)

Lähte is a small borough (alevik) in Tartu Parish, Tartu County in eastern Estonia. As of the 2011 census, the settlement's population was 492.
