= Koogi, Tartu County =

Village in Estonia

Koogi
- Village
- Location in Estonia
- Coordinates: 58°34′15″N 26°29′48″E
- Country: Estonia
- County: Tartu County
- Municipality: Tartu Parish

Population (01.01.2009)
  - Total: 75

Koogi is a village in Tartu Parish, Tartu County, Estonia. It has a population of 75 (as of 1 January 2009).
