= Sootaga =

Village in Estonia

- Village
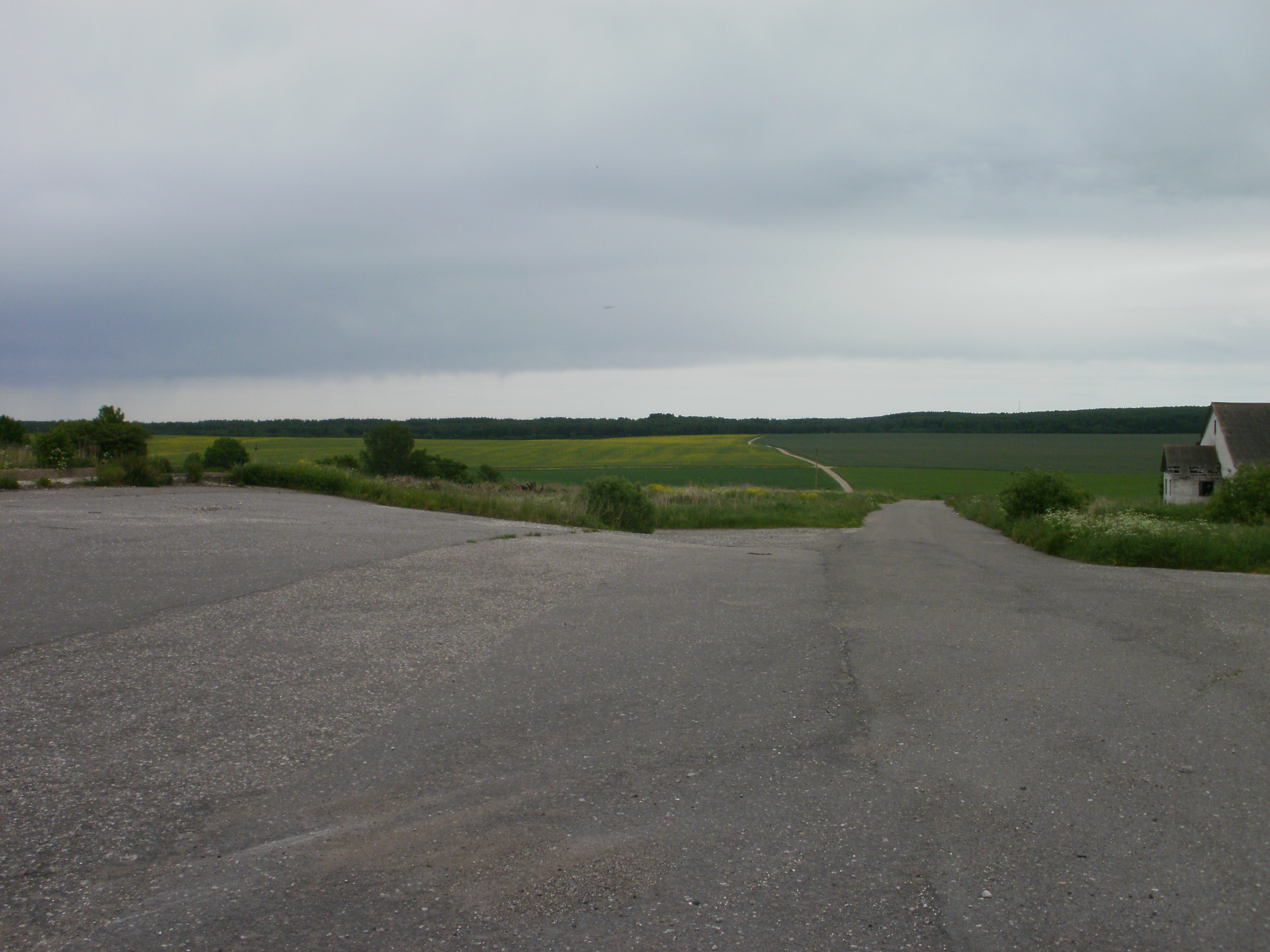
- Village in Estonia

- Location within Estonia
- Coordinates: 58.490555555556°N 26.7025°E
- Country: Estonia
- County: Tartu County
- Parish: Tartu Parish
- Time zone: UTC+2 (EET)
  - Summer (DST): UTC+3 (EEST)

Sootaga is a village in Tartu Parish, Tartu County in Estonia.
