= Aovere =

Village in Estonia

- village
- Location in Estonia
- Coordinates: 58°26′47″N 26°49′48″E
- Country: Estonia
- County: Tartu County
- Municipality: Tartu Parish

Population (2011 Census)
  - Total: 96

Aovere is a village in Tartu Parish, Tartu County, Estonia. As of the 2011 census, the settlement's population was 96.
