= Tormi =

Village in Estonia

- Village
- Location within Estonia
- Coordinates: 58.565555555556°N 26.592222222222°E
- Country: Estonia
- County: Tartu County
- Parish: Tartu Parish
- Time zone: UTC+2 (EET)
  - Summer (DST): UTC+3 (EEST)

Tormi is a village in Tartu Parish, Tartu County in Estonia.
