= Taabri =

Village in Estonia

- Village
- Location within Estonia
- Coordinates: 58.456388888889°N 26.958611111111°E
- Country: Estonia
- County: Tartu County
- Parish: Tartu Parish
- Time zone: UTC+2 (EET)
  - Summer (DST): UTC+3 (EEST)

Taabri is a village in Tartu Parish, Tartu County in Estonia. The population is 40 people (2019).
