= Kõrveküla =

Borough in Estonia

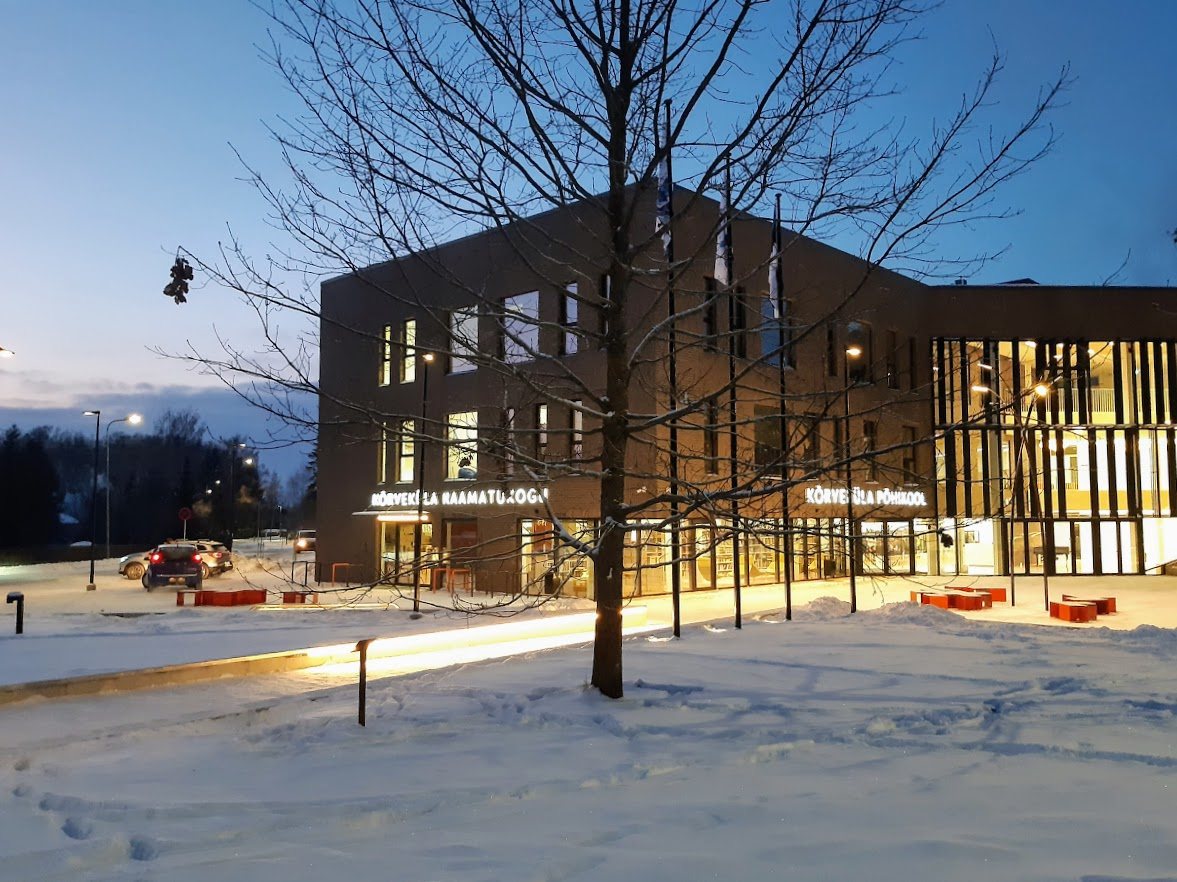
- Kõrveküla library and elementary school

- Location within Estonia
- Coordinates: 58°25′27″N 26°46′56″E
- Country: Estonia
- County: Tartu County

Population (2011 Census)
  - Total: 733
- Time zone: UTC+2 (EET)

Kõrveküla is a small borough (alevik) in Tartu Parish, Tartu County in eastern Estonia. As of the 2011 census, the settlement's population was 733. There is also commune administration.

The composer, choral conductor, and organist Miina Härma (1864–1941) was born at the schoolhouse in Kõrveküla. Today the building hosts a museum dedicated to her life and career.
