= List of Christian monasteries in Estonia =

This is a list, as yet incomplete, of Christian monasteries and religious houses, both extant and dissolved, in Estonia, for both men and women.

== List of Christian monasteries in Estonia ==
- Kärkna Abbey Cistercian (inactive)
- Lihula Convent Cistercian (inactive)
- Padise Abbey Cistercian (inactive)
- Pirita Convent Bridgettine (inactive)
- Pirita New Convent Bridgettine (active)
- Pühtitsa Convent Orthodox (active)
- St Anne's Monastery, Narva Dominican (inactive)
- St Catherine's Monastery, Tallinn Dominican
- St Catherine's Convent, Tartu Cistercian (inactive)
- St Clare's Priory, Tartu Franciscan (inactive)
- St Mary Magdalene's Abbey, Tartu Dominican (inactive)
- St. Michael's Convent, Tallinn Cistercian (inactive)
- St Michael's Friary, Rakvere Franciscan (inactive)
- Viljandi Friary Franciscan (inactive)

== See also ==
- List of churches in Estonia
- List of cathedrals in Estonia
