= Kõduküla, Tartu Parish =

Village in Estonia

Kõduküla
- Village
- Location in Estonia
- Coordinates: 58°33′53″N 26°30′46″E
- Country: Estonia
- County: Tartu County
- Municipality: Tartu Parish

Population (01.01.2009)
  - Total: 28

Kõduküla is a village in Tartu Parish, Tartu County, Estonia. It has a population of 28 (as of 1 January 2009).
