= Erala =

Village in Estonia

- Village
- Location within Estonia
- Coordinates: 58°28′18″N 26°41′50″E
- Country: Estonia
- County: Tartu
- Parish: Tartu

Population (2011 Census)
  - Total: 225

Erala is a village in Tartu Parish, Tartu County, Estonia. As of the 2011 census, the settlement's population was 225.
