= Kärkna Abbey =

Former monastery in Estonia

Coordinates: 58.4636397°N 26.6022348°E

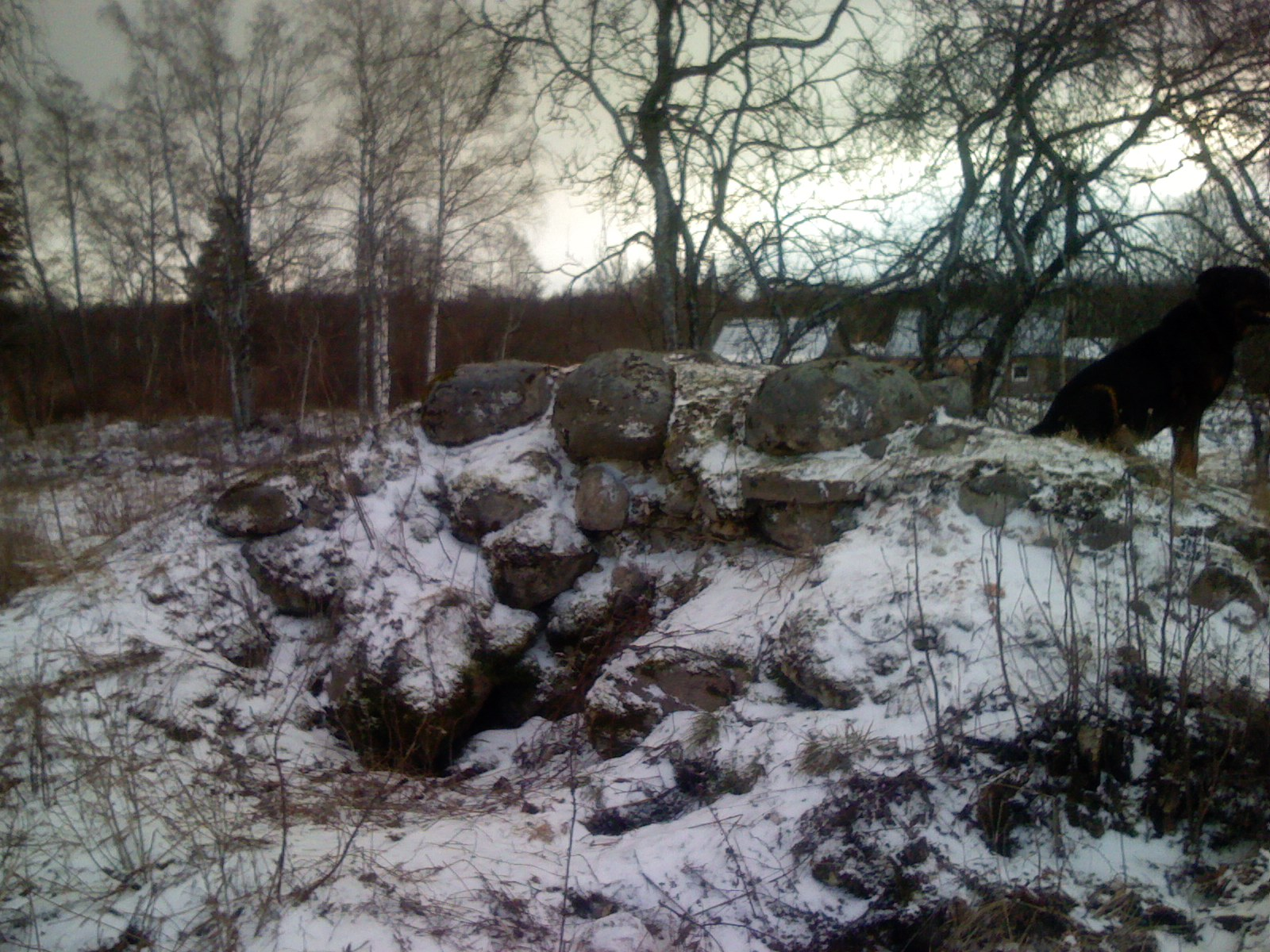
Ruins of Kärkna Abbey

Kärkna Abbey (Estonian: Kärkna klooster; German: Kloster Falkenau or Valkenau), now ruined, was a former Cistercian monastery in Estonia.

== Situation ==
The monastery was sited about 8 km north of Tartu (formerly Dorpat) in the village of Lammiku near the point where the Amme River flows into the Emajõgi River.

== History ==
The monastery was founded before 1233 by the Bishop of Dorpat, Hermann von Buxhoeveden, and settled by monks from Pforta Abbey, of the filiation of Morimond. An early destruction by heathen inhabitants of the district is mentioned in 1234. After attacks by Russian forces from the principality of Vladimir-Suzdal and the Novgorod Republic it was rebuilt in about 1240 as a fortress surrounded by a moat and a rectangular granite wall. In 1305 it was placed under Stolpe Abbey on the Peene in Pomerania, which had joined the Cistercian order the previous year. In August 1558 the monastery was destroyed at the beginning of the Livonian War. There are remains of the foundations and of the perimeter walls.

== Buildings ==
The rectangular church was about 47 metres long, and consisted of a single nave of five vaulted bays. Unusually for a Cistercian church it also had a crypt of 10 bays containing two aisles, which was used not only as a place of burial but also as a place of shelter during hostilities. To the south of the church were attached the conventual buildings in the usual form of three ranges arranged in a square round a cloister and a central courtyard, with the chapter house in the east range.

== List of abbots ==
- P.: 1234
- Godefridus: 1253
- B.: 1264
- Winandus: 1277–1288
- Daniel: 1295–1298
- Johannes de Hapsele: before 1304
- Dithmarus: 1304–1308
- Hermannus: 1327–1336
- Everhardus: 1346
- Johannes: 1354
- Albertus: 1388–1397
- Bertoldus: 1411–1433
- Gotfrid Mäke: 1462–1466
- Johannes: 1484
- Lambert: 1504–1525
- Christoph Hogenstein: 1528–1535
- Gerardus: 1538–1540
- Hermann Wesel: 1544–1558 (also Bishop of Dorpat from 1554)

== See also ==
- List of Christian religious houses in Estonia
