= Pataste =

Village in Estonia

- Village
- Location within Estonia
- Coordinates: 58.5781°N 26.7628°E
- Country: Estonia
- County: Tartu County
- Parish: Tartu Parish
- Time zone: UTC+2 (EET)
  - Summer (DST): UTC+3 (EEST)

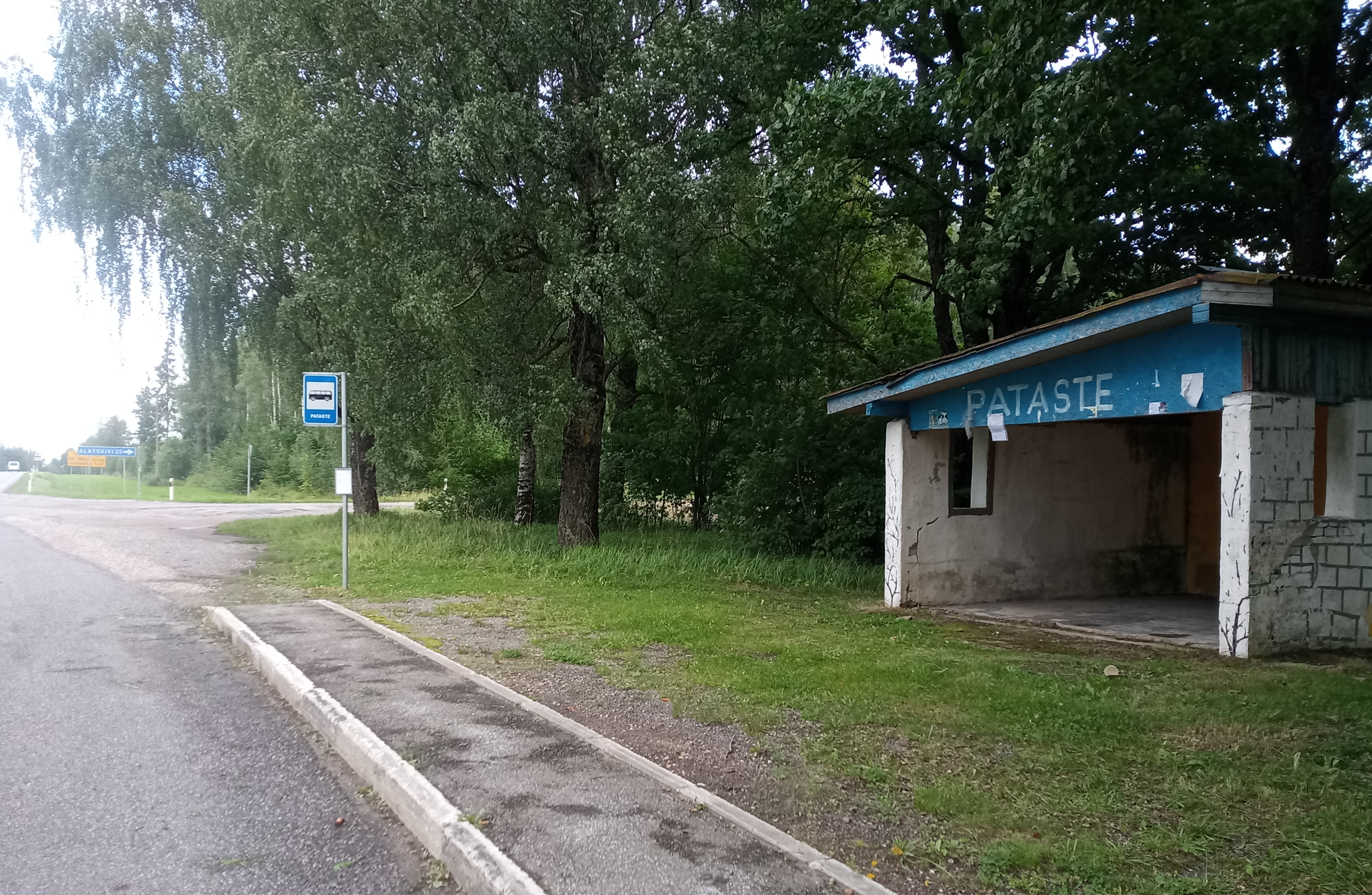
Bus stop in Pataste village

Pataste (German: Pattas) is a village in Tartu Parish, Tartu County in Estonia.

== Notable people ==
Notable people that were born in Pataste include the following:

- Voldemar Ojansoon (1897–1942), lawyer and diplomat
