= Vesneri =

Village in Estonia

- Village
- Location within Estonia
- Coordinates: 58.431111111111°N 26.843888888889°E
- Country: Estonia
- County: Tartu County
- Parish: Tartu Parish
- Time zone: UTC+2 (EET)
  - Summer (DST): UTC+3 (EEST)

Vesneri is a village in Tartu Parish, Tartu County in Estonia.

Vesneri is home to Weisner Park and Alley (Vesner Park and Boulevard) which is a small wooded area containing houses and an unnamed road.
