= Elistvere =

Village in Estonia

- Village
- Location in Estonia
- Coordinates: 58°34′23″N 26°41′20″E
- Country: Estonia
- County: Tartu County
- Municipality: Tartu Parish

Population (01.01.2009)
  - Total: 44

Elistvere is a village in Tartu Parish, Tartu County, Estonia. It has a population of 44 (as of 1 January 2009).

== Elistvere Animal Park ==
Elistvere is the location of Elistvere Animal Park (:et), where visitors can see the animals living in Estonian forests, such as a bear.
