= Tammistu, Harju County =

Village in Estonia

Coordinates: 59°37′28″N 25°29′51″E

Tammistu
- Village
- Interactive map of Tammistu
- Country: Estonia
- County: Harju County
- Parish: Kuusalu Parish
- Time zone: UTC+2 (EET)
  - Summer (DST): UTC+3 (EEST)

Tammistu is a village in Kuusalu Parish, Harju County in northern Estonia.
