= Maarja-Magdaleena =

Village in Estonia

- Village
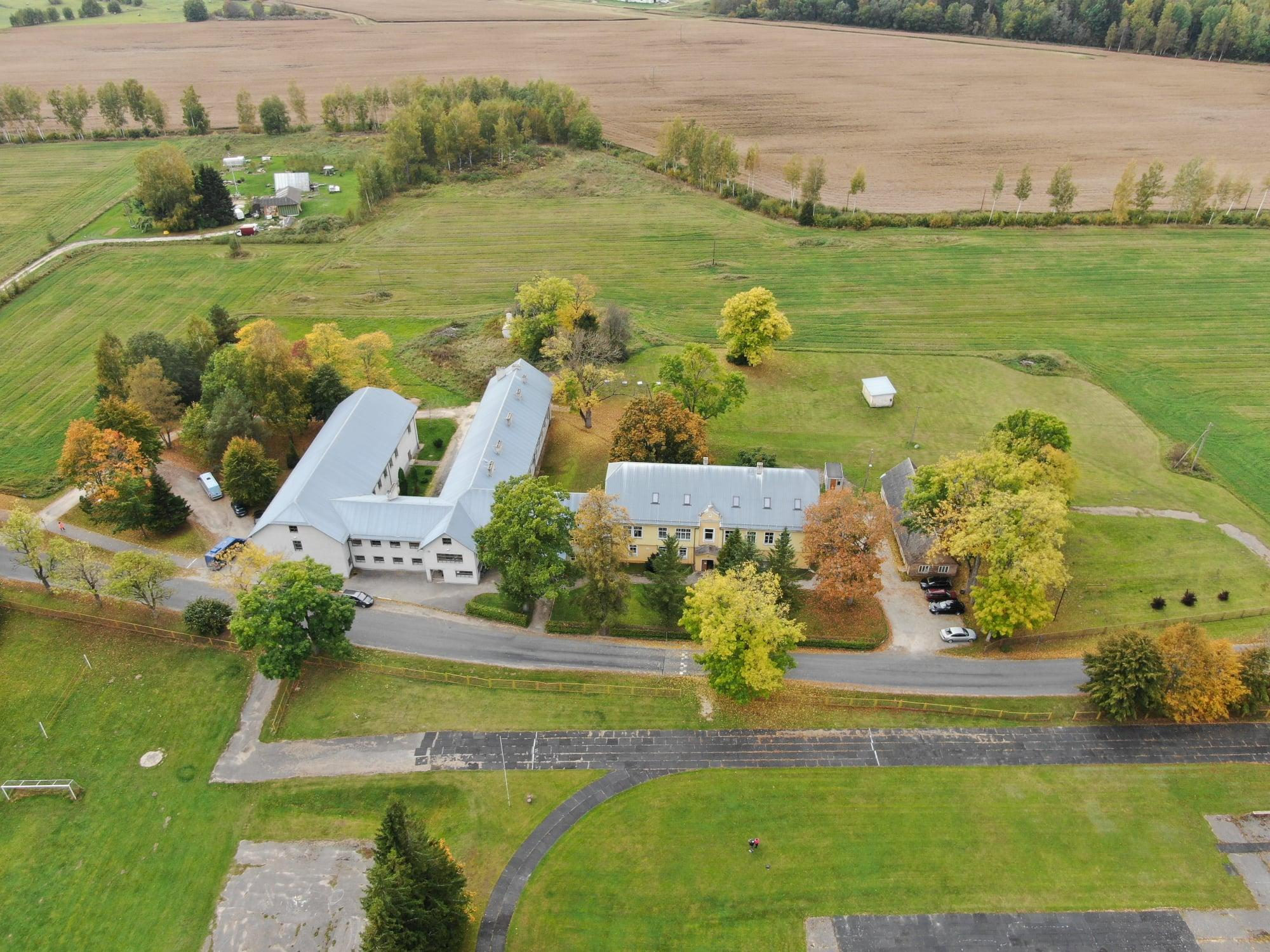
- Maarja-Magdaleena elementary school

- Location in Estonia
- Coordinates: 58°36′38″N 26°44′23″E
- Country: Estonia
- County: Tartu County
- Municipality: Tartu Parish

Population (01.01.2009)
  - Total: 256

Maarja-Magdaleena is a village in Tartu Parish, Tartu County, Estonia. It has a population of 256 (as of 1 January 2009).

== Maarja-Magdaleena church ==
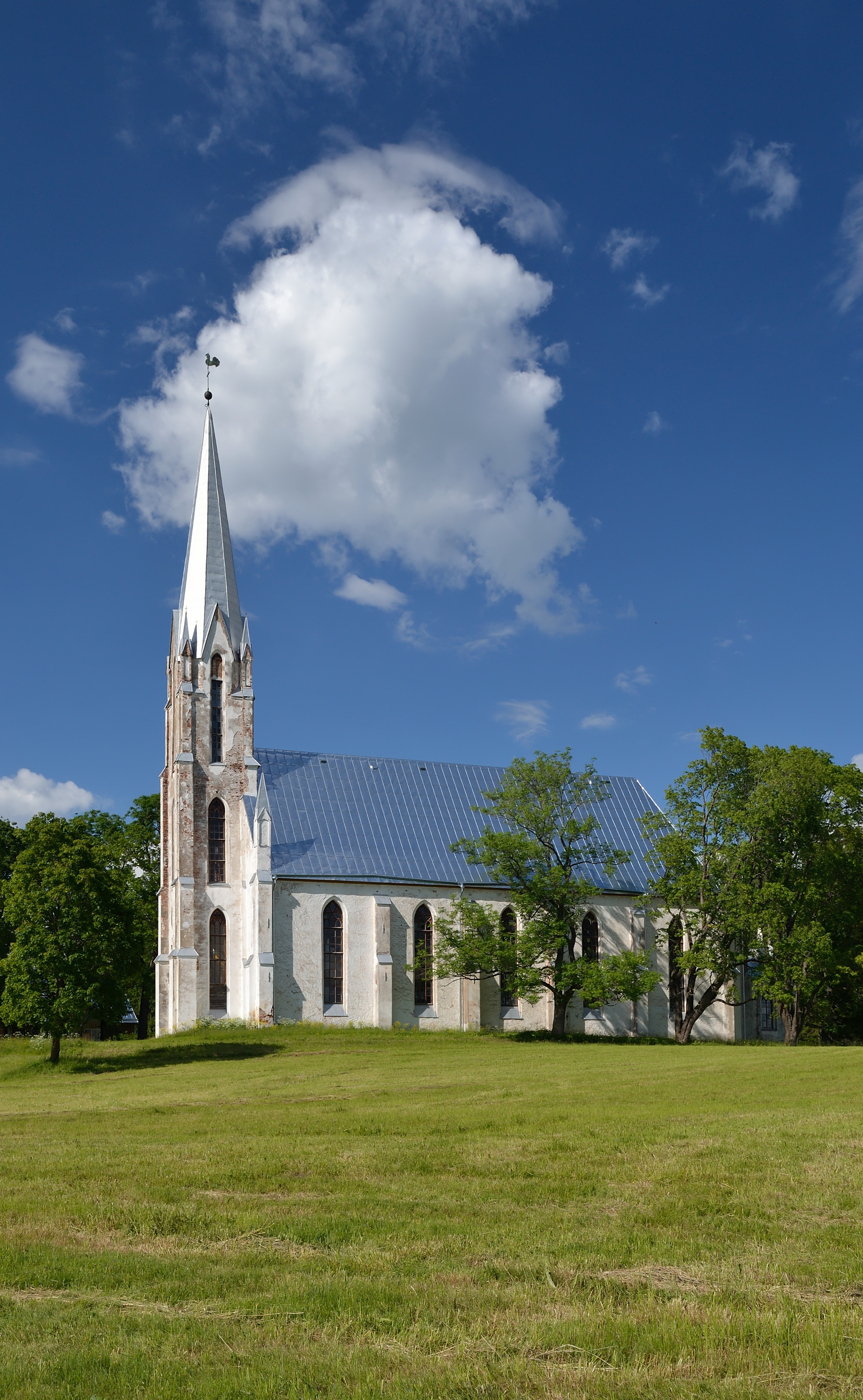
Maarja-Magdaleena church

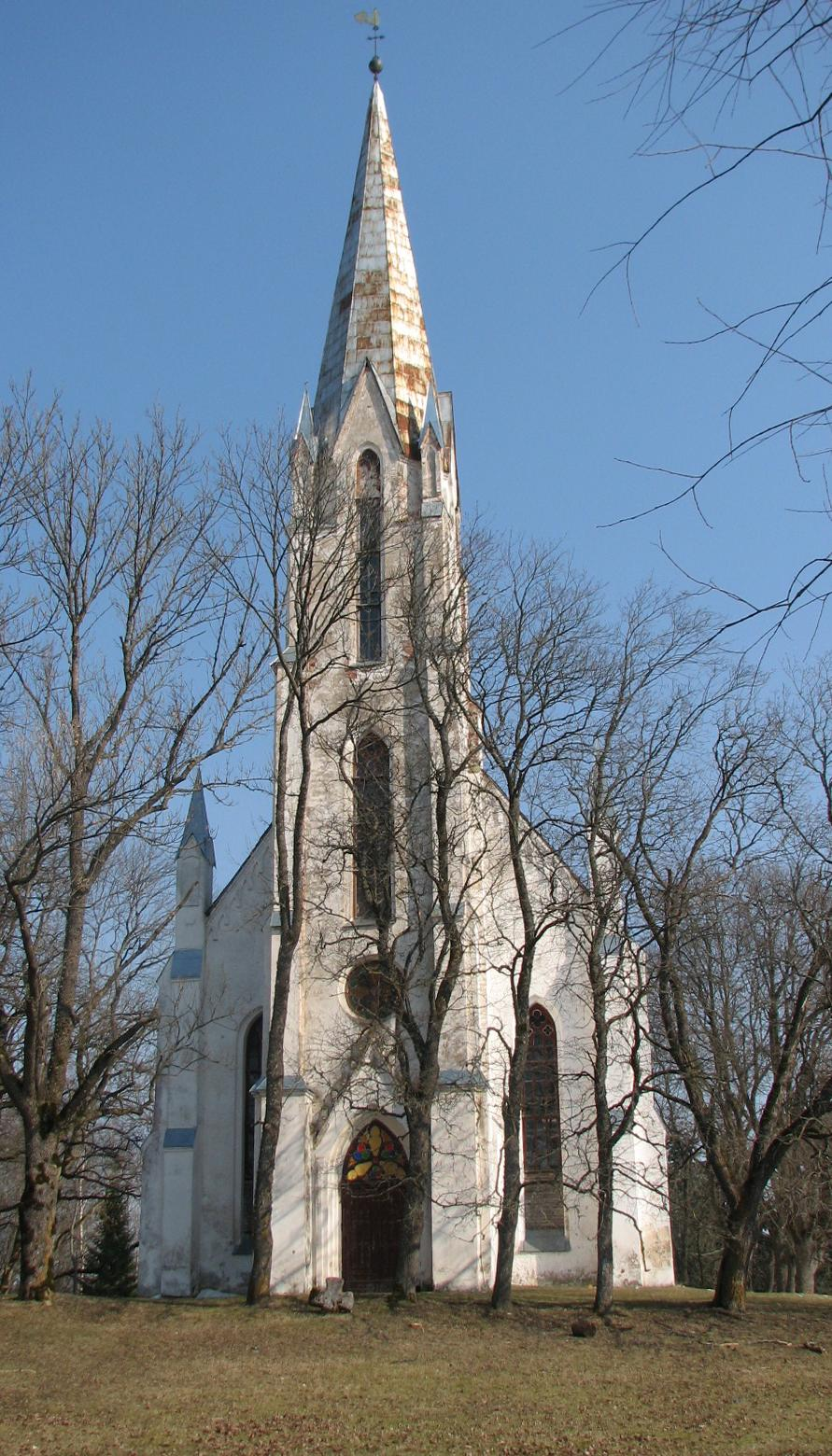
View from west

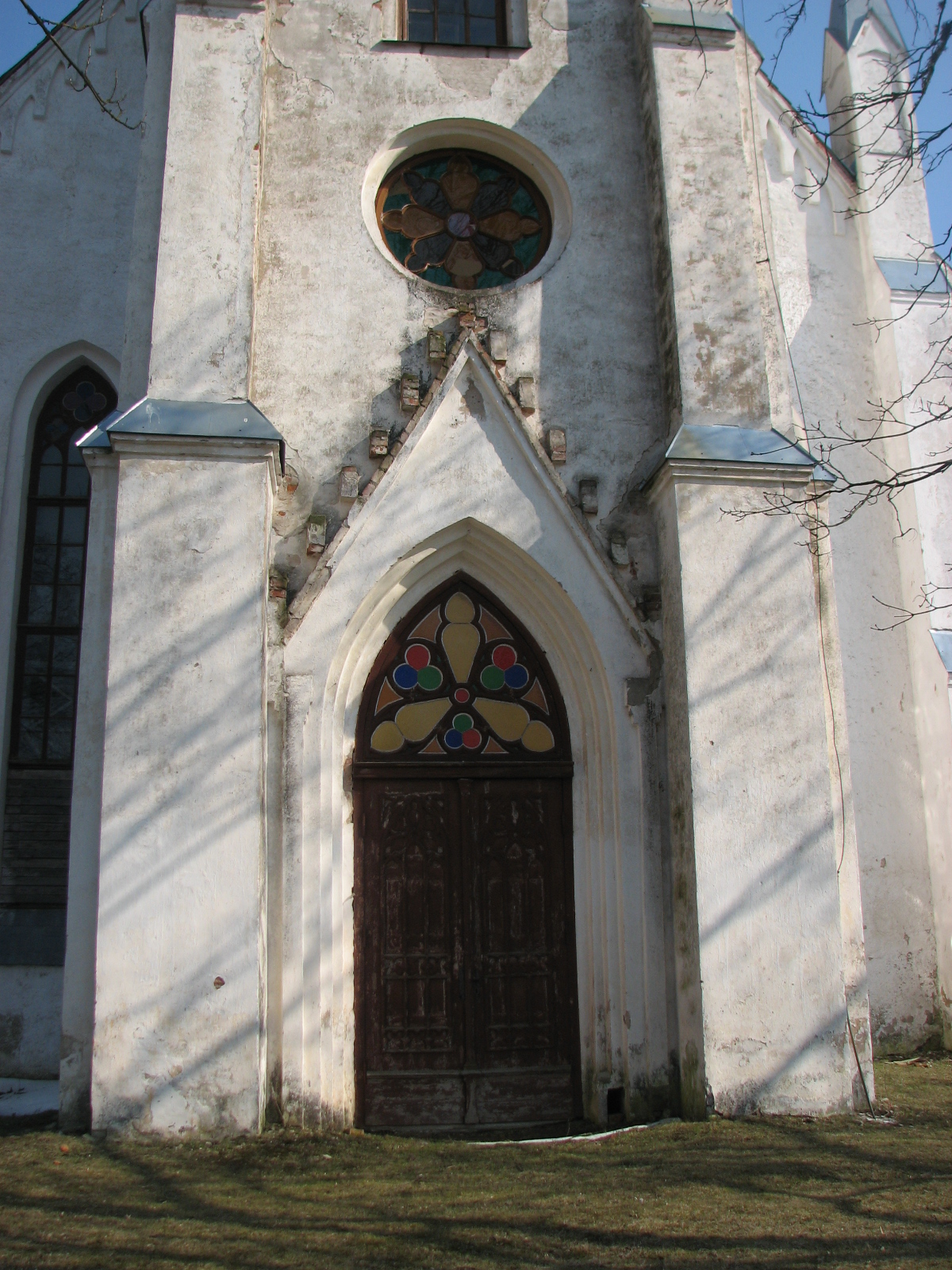
Main entrance

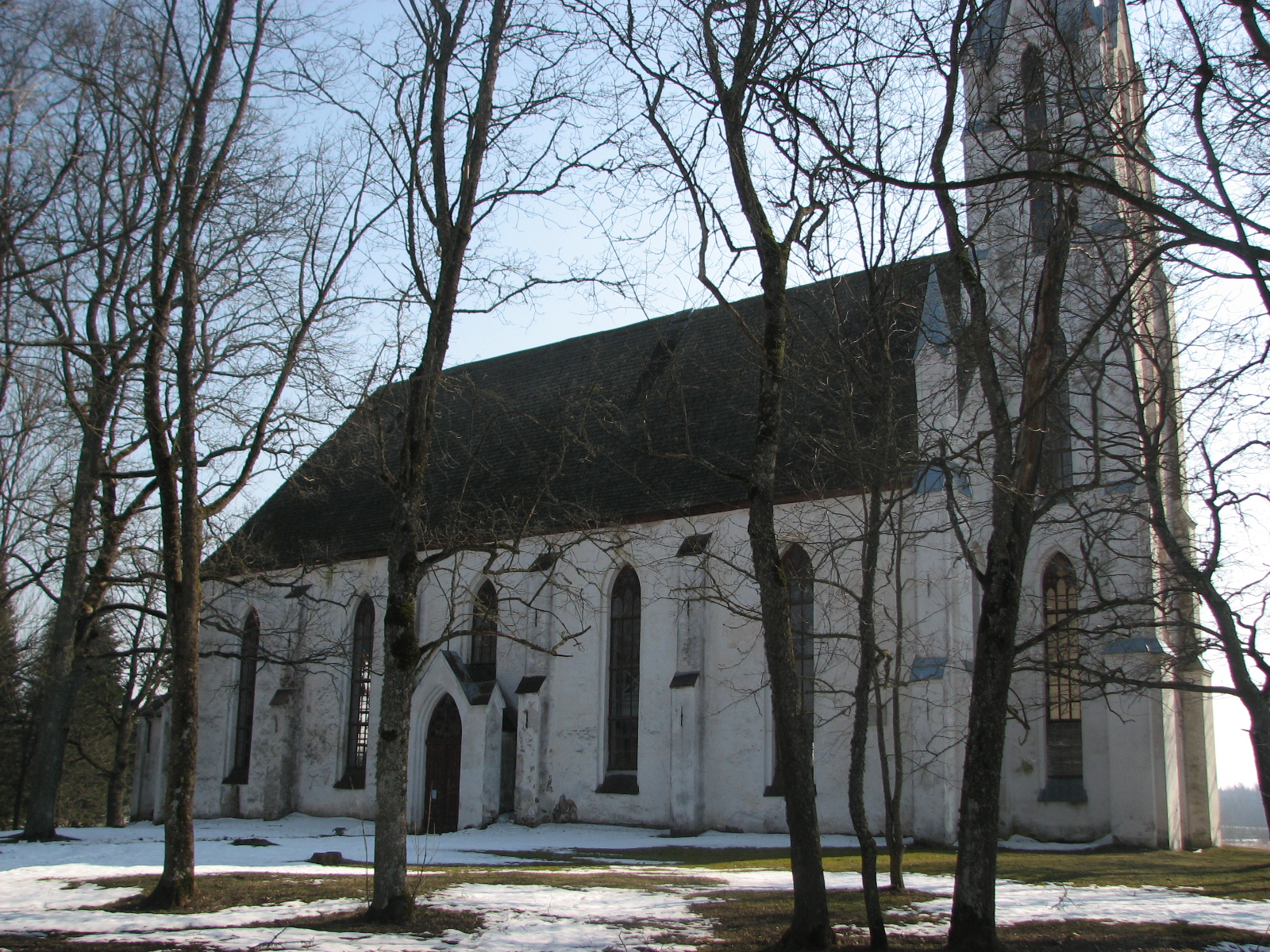
View from northwest
