= Tammistu, Tartu County =

Village in Estonia

Tammistu
- Village
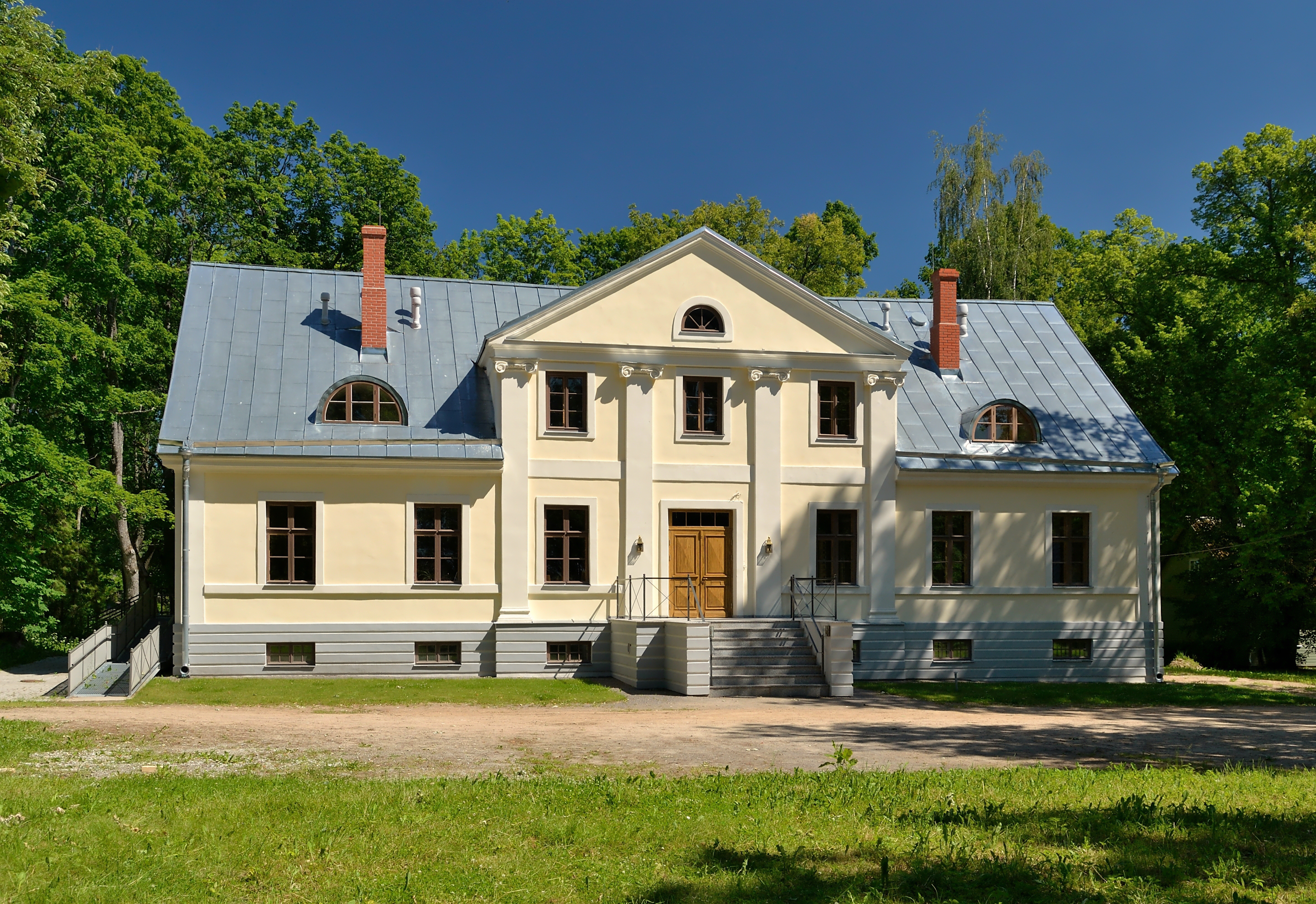
- Tammistu manor

- Location in Estonia
- Coordinates: 58°26′10.65″N 26°54′42.46″E
- Country: Estonia
- County: Tartu County
- Municipality: Tartu Parish

Tammistu is a village in Tartu Parish, Tartu County in Estonia.

== Tammistu manor ==
Tammistu estate (German: Tammist) was separated from nearby Kavastu estate in the early 18th century, and has belonged to several different local aristocratic families until 1919, when the government of newly independent Estonia carried out a land reform which rid the aristocracy of basically all its land. The present building dates from the second half of the 19th century.

== Gallery ==
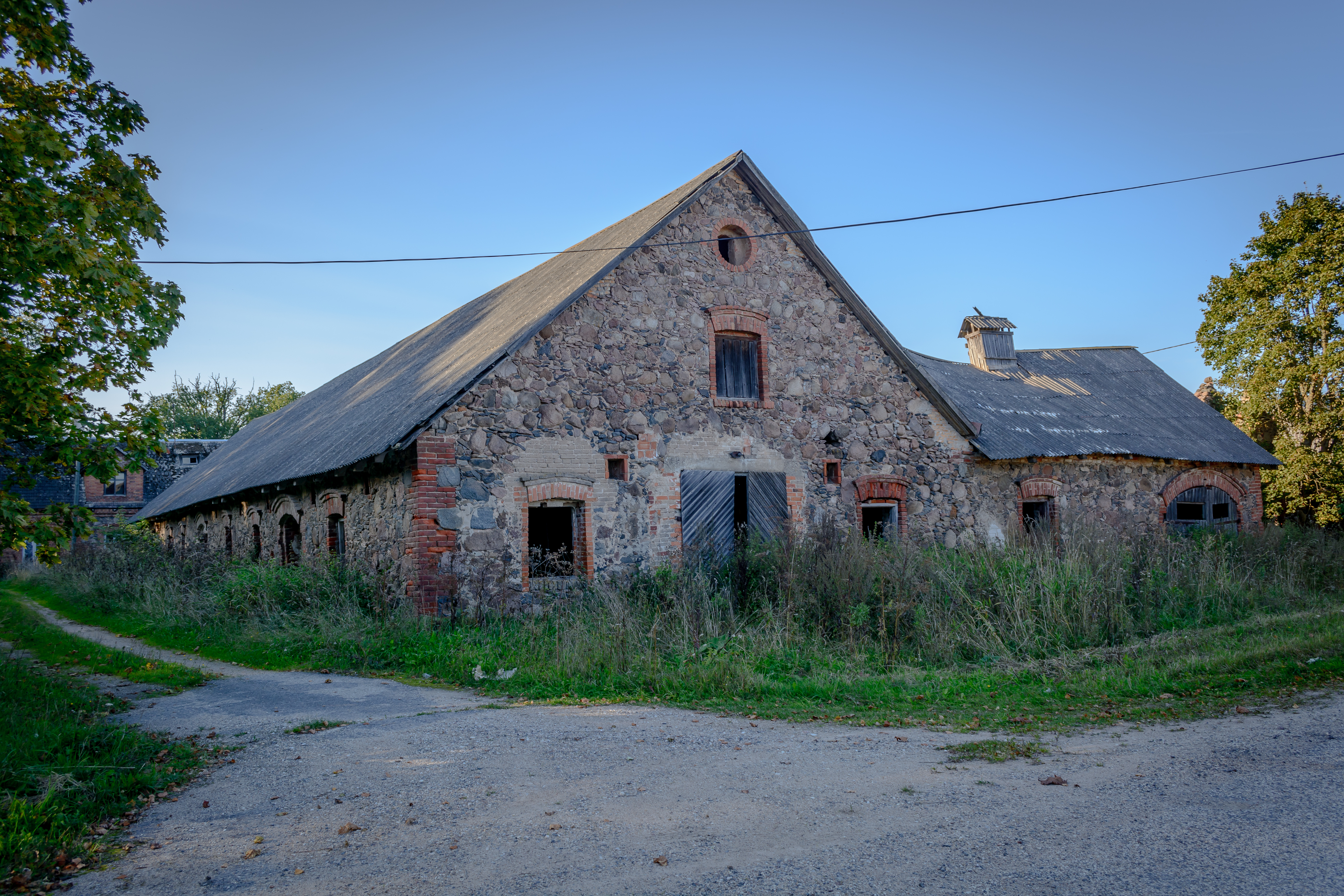
Manor cowhouse

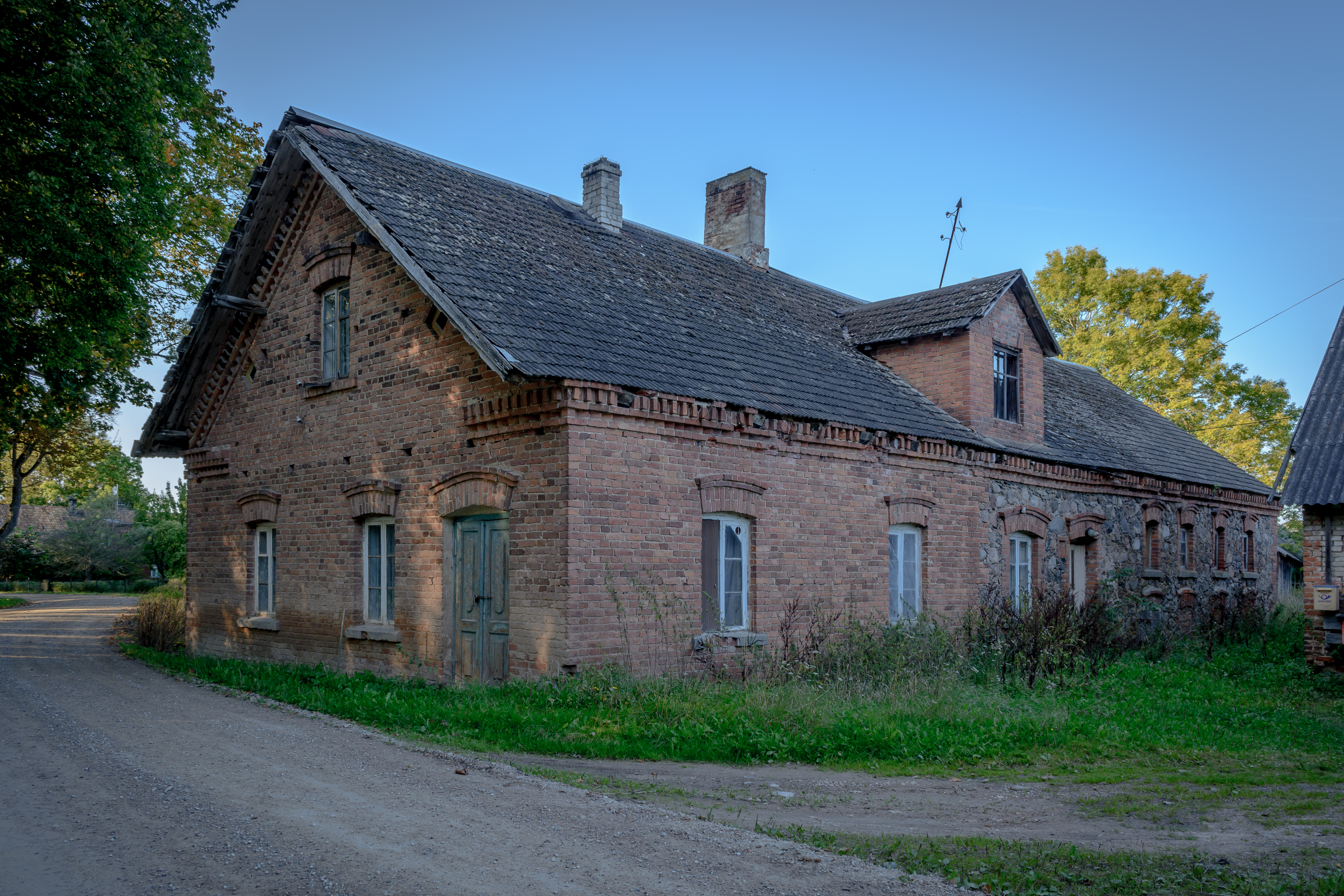
Manor dairy

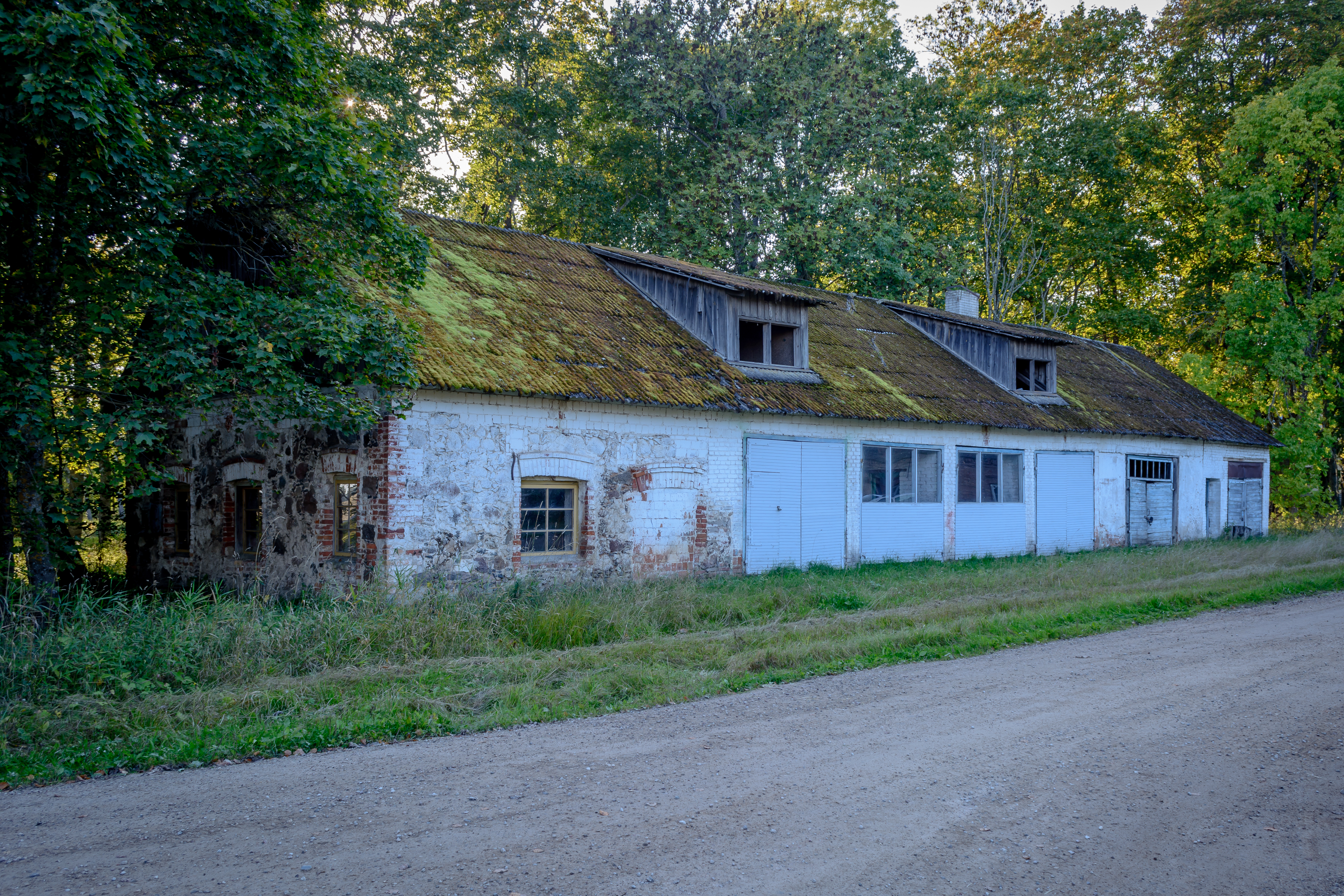
Manor stable
