= Juula, Tartu County =

Village in Estonia

Juula
- Village
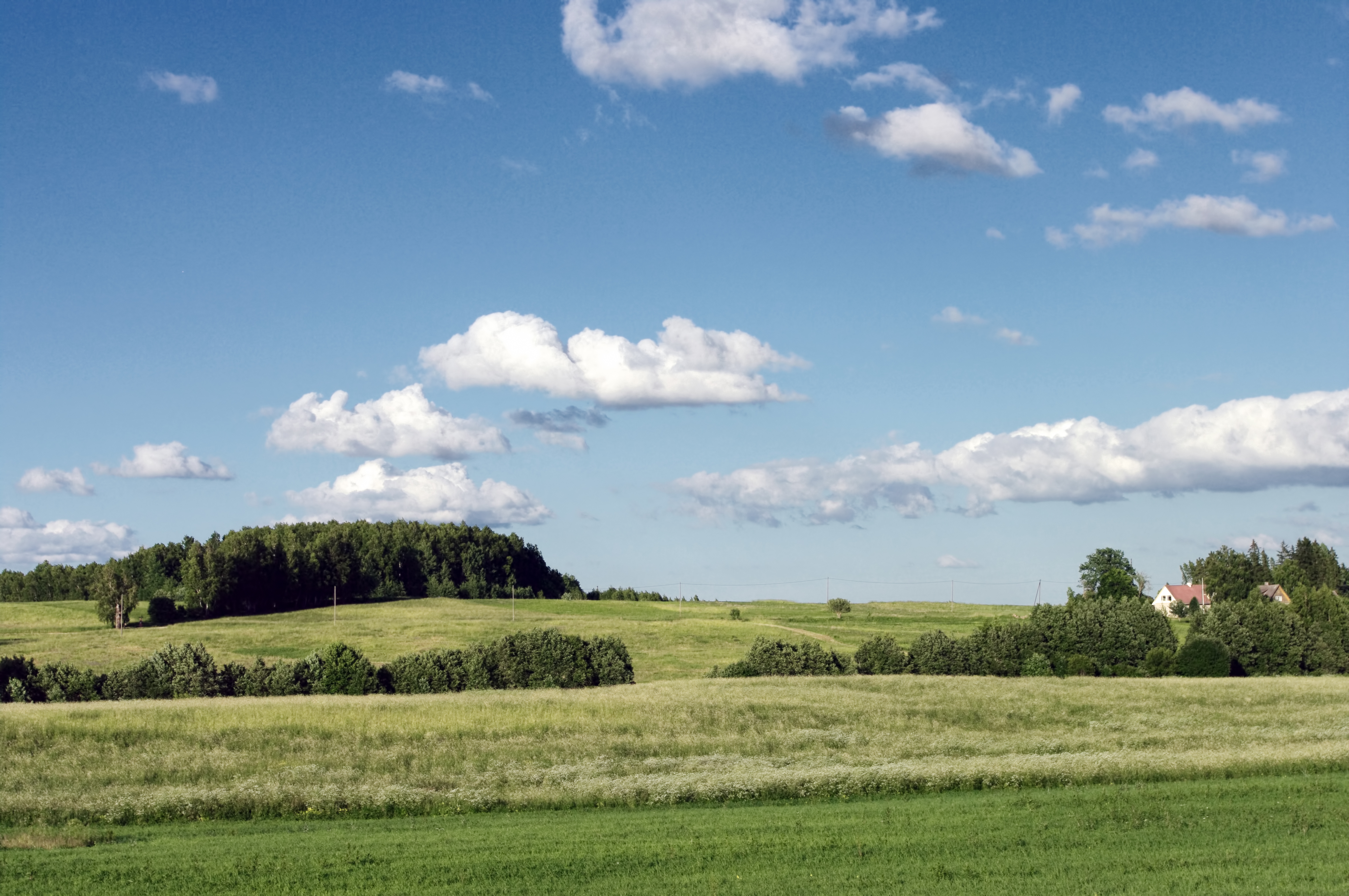

- Location in Estonia
- Coordinates: 58°33′22″N 26°42′54″E
- Country: Estonia
- County: Tartu County
- Municipality: Tartu Parish

Population (01.01.2009)
  - Total: 55

Juula is a village in Tartu Parish, Tartu County, Estonia. It has a population of 55 (as of 1 January 2009).
