= Tabivere =

Borough in Estonia

- Small borough
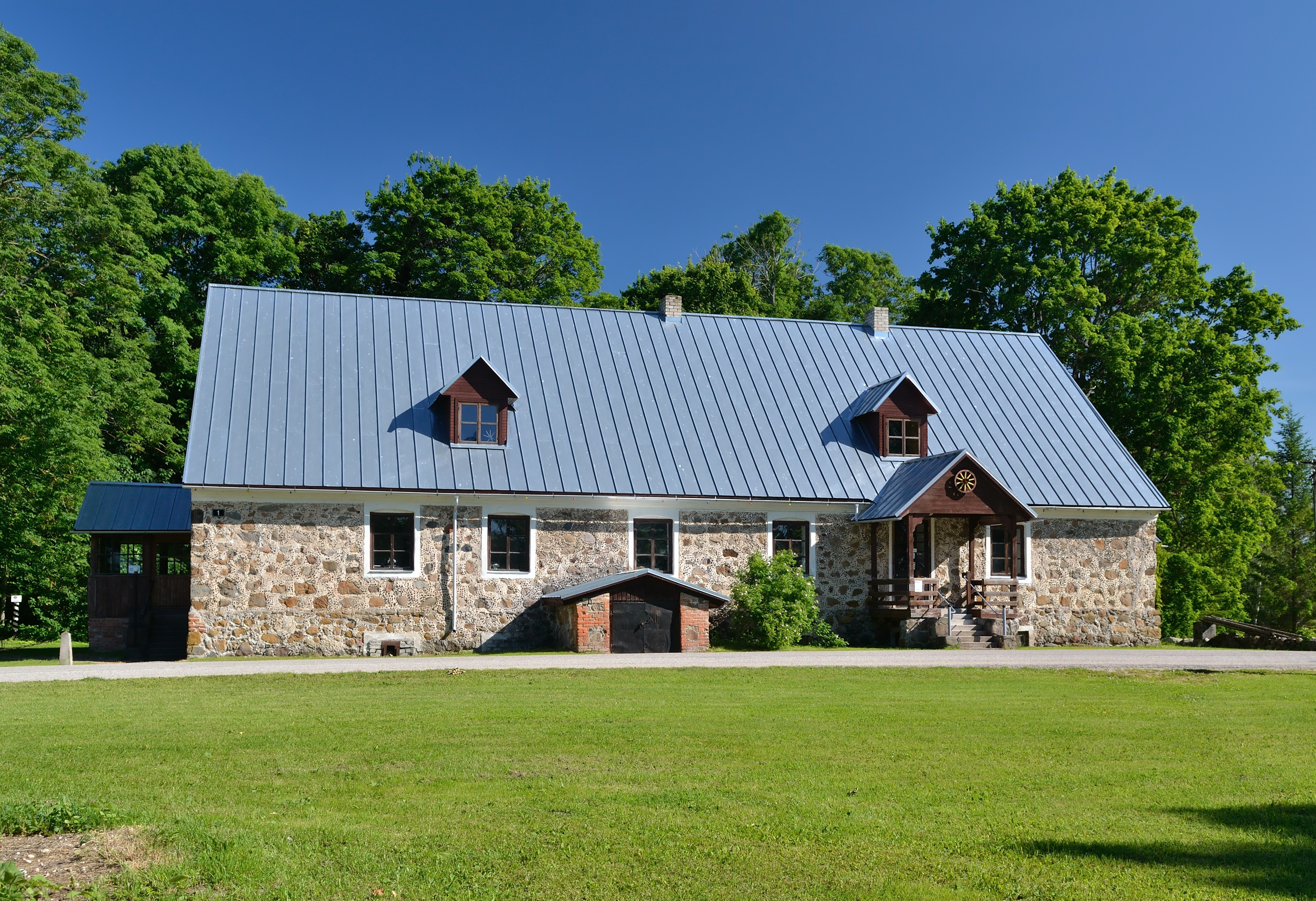
- Tabivere museum

- Location in Estonia
- Coordinates: 58°33′18″N 26°35′43″E
- Country: Estonia
- County: Tartu County
- Municipality: Tartu Parish

Population (2011 Census)
  - Total: 971

Tabivere is a small borough (Estonian: alevik) in Tartu Parish, Tartu County, Estonia. As of the 2011 census, the settlement's population was 971.
