= Tabivere Parish =

Former municipality of Estonia

Coordinates: 58.554°N 26.596°E

Tabivere Parish Tabivere vald
- Former municipality of Estonia
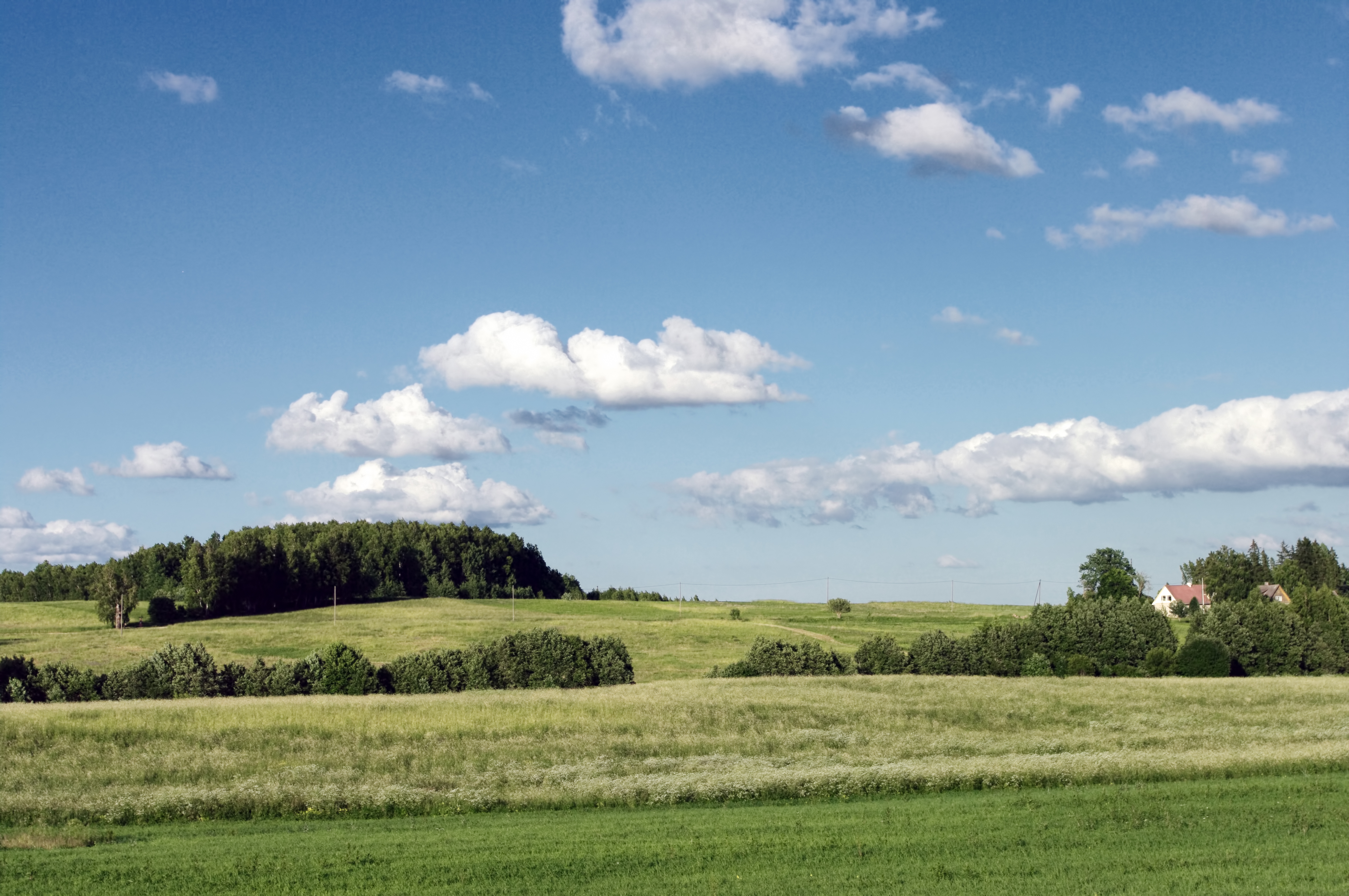
- Countryside in Juula

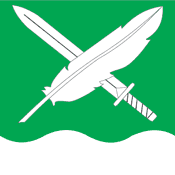
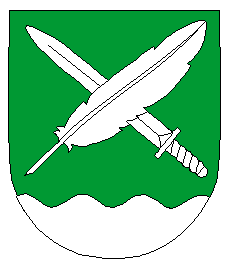
- Flag Coat of arms

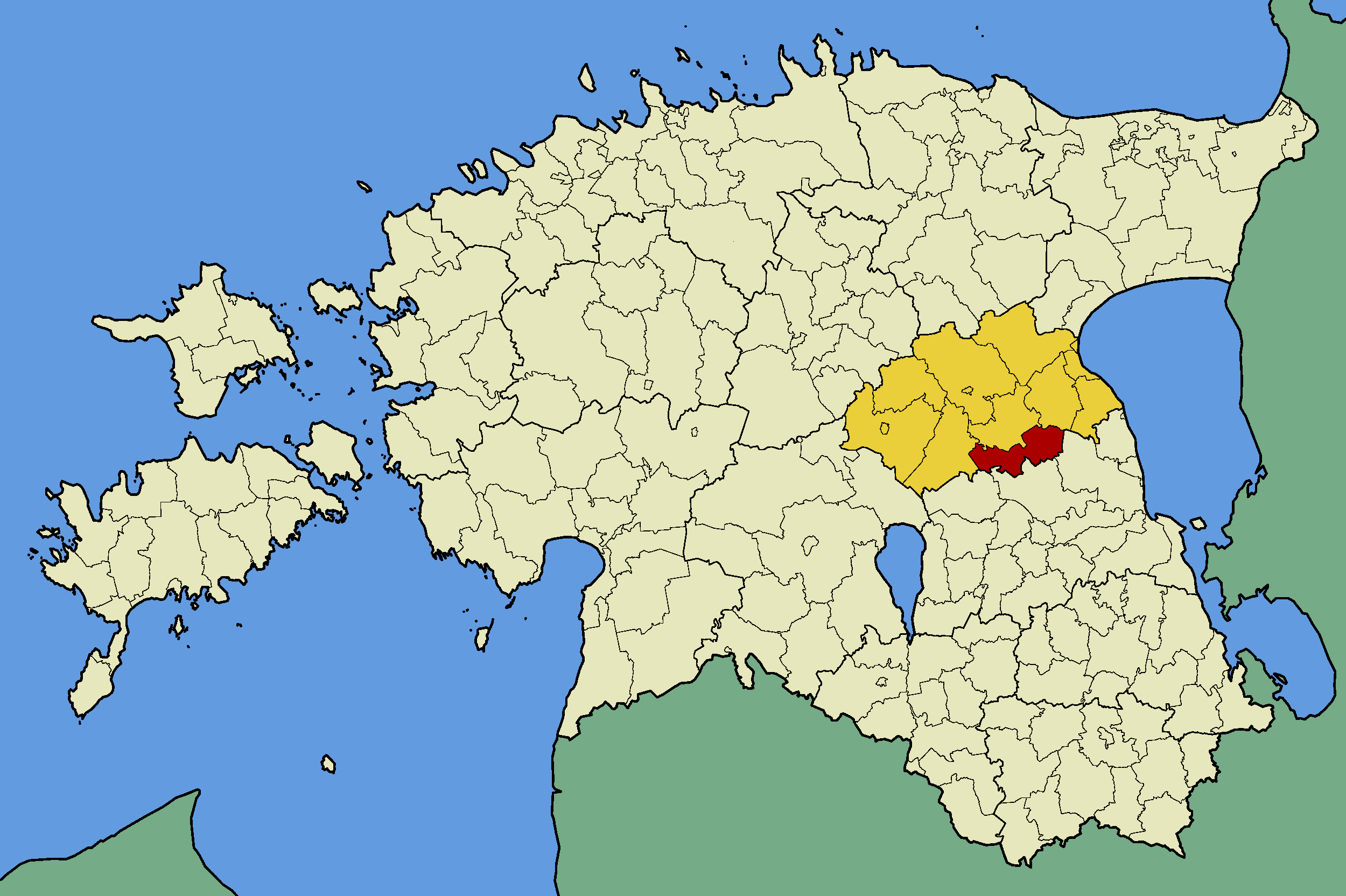
- Tabivere Parish within Jõgeva County.
- Country: Estonia
- County: Jõgeva County
- Administrative centre: Tabivere

Area
  - Total: 201 km^{2} (78 sq mi)

Population (2006)
  - Total: 2,468
  - Density: 12.3/km^{2} (31.8/sq mi)
- Website: www.tabivere.ee

Tabivere (Estonian: Tabivere vald) was a rural municipality of Estonia, in Jõgeva County. It had a population of 2468 (2006) and an area of 201 km^{2}.

== Populated places ==
Tabivere Parish had 1 small borough and 24 villages.

Small borough

Tabivere

Villages

Elistvere - Juula - Kaiavere - Kaitsemõisa - Kärksi - Kassema - Kõduküla - Kõnnujõe - Koogi - Kõrenduse - Lilu - Maarja-Magdaleena - Otslava - Õvanurme - Pataste - Raigastvere - Reinu - Sepa - Sortsi - Tormi - Uhmardu - Vahi - Valgma - Voldi

== See also ==
- Elistvere Animal Park
