= Amme =

River in Estonia

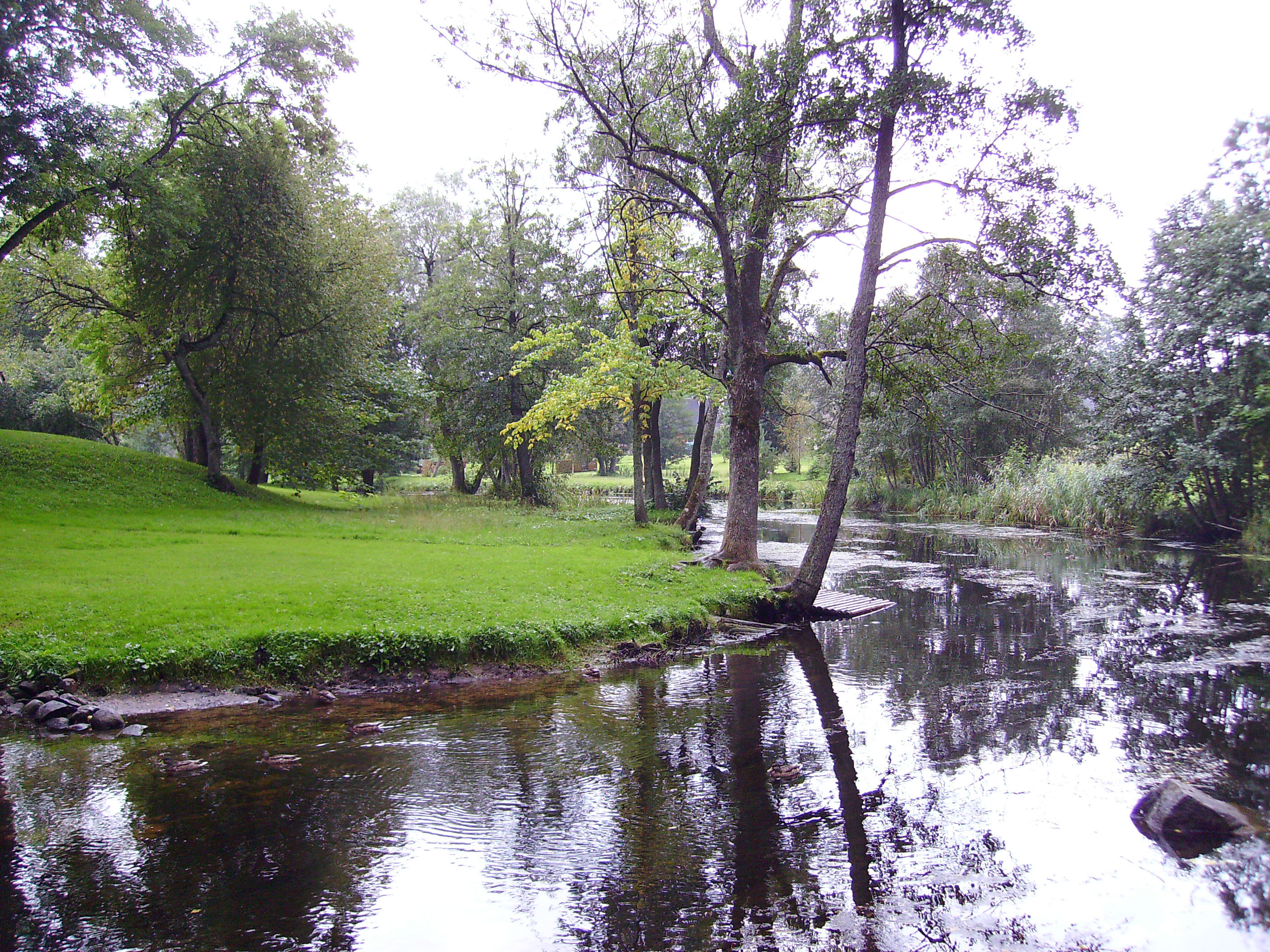
- The Amme in Palamuse

- Location of the mouth in Estonia

Location
- Country: Estonia

Physical characteristics
- Source: Lake Kuremaa
  - coordinates: 58°42′9.5″N 26°34′25.5″E
  - elevation: 51.6 m (169 ft)
- Mouth: Emajõgi
  - coordinates: 58°27′41.5″N 26°35′47.6″E
- Length: 59 km (37 mi)
- Basin size: 501 km^{2} (193 sq mi)

Basin features
- Progression: Emajõgi→ Lake Peipus→ Narva→ Gulf of Finland
- Tributaries
  - left: Vara stream
  - right: Mudajõgi

The Amme (also known as Aame, Ame and Amedi) is a 59 km (37 mi) long river mostly in Vooremaa, Estonia. It is a left tributary of the Emajõgi. Its source is Lake Kuremaa near Palamuse and it passes through the Kaiavere Lake, Elistvere Lake and drains into the Emajõgi near the site of former Kärkna Abbey. The basin area of the Amme is 501 km^{2} (193 sq mi).

== Gallery ==
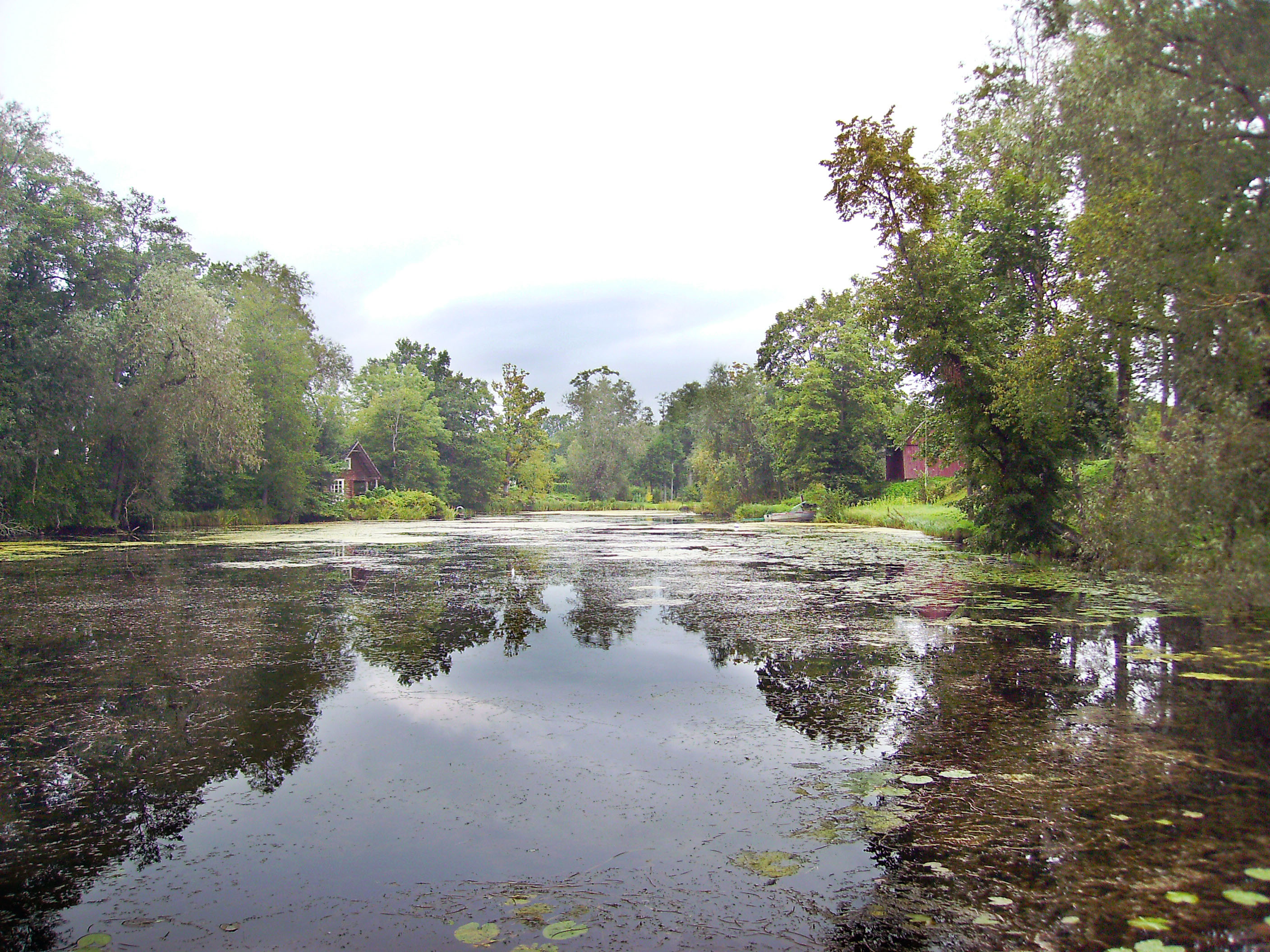
The reservoir in Palamuse

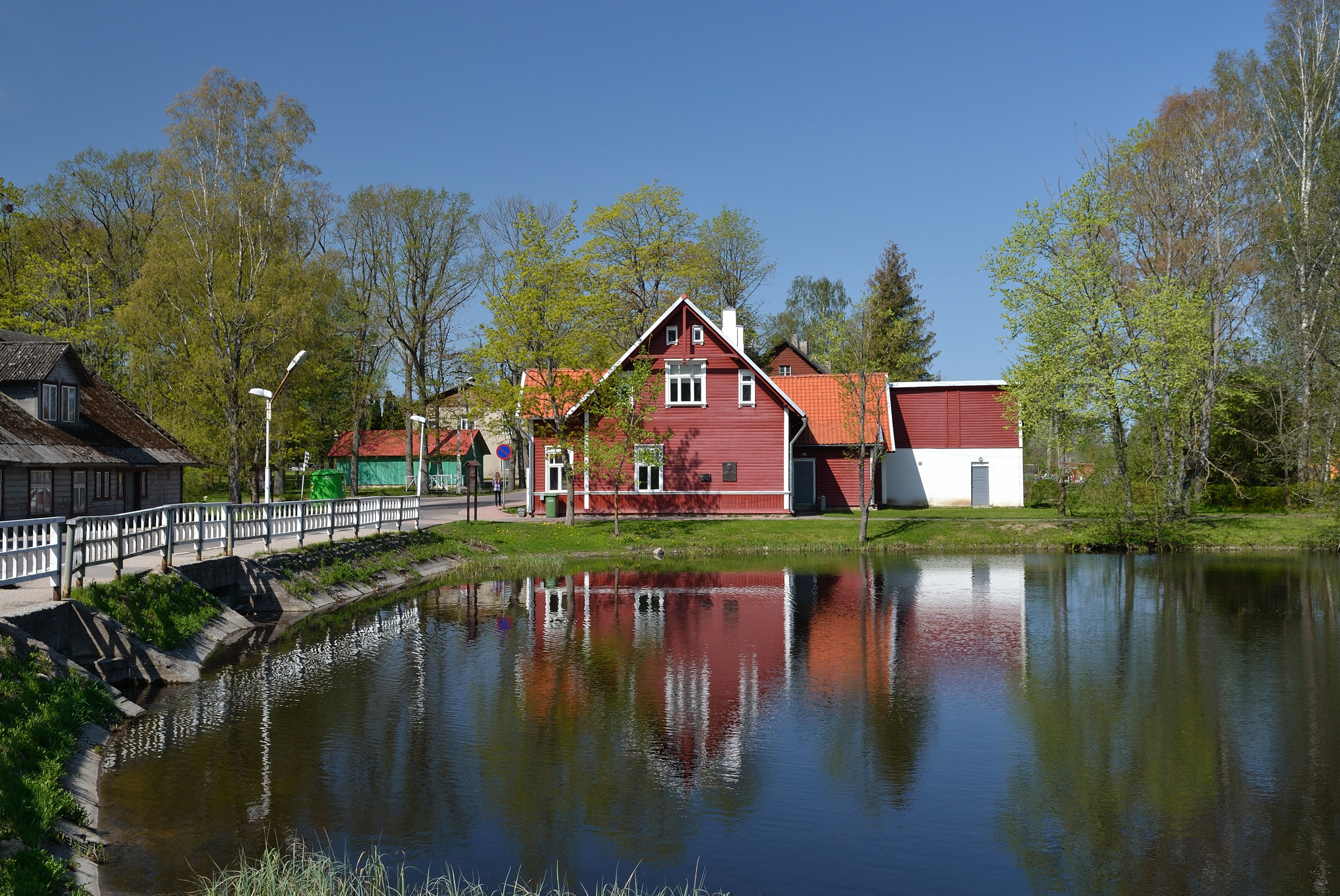
Lake Palamuse, a reservoir on the Amme River

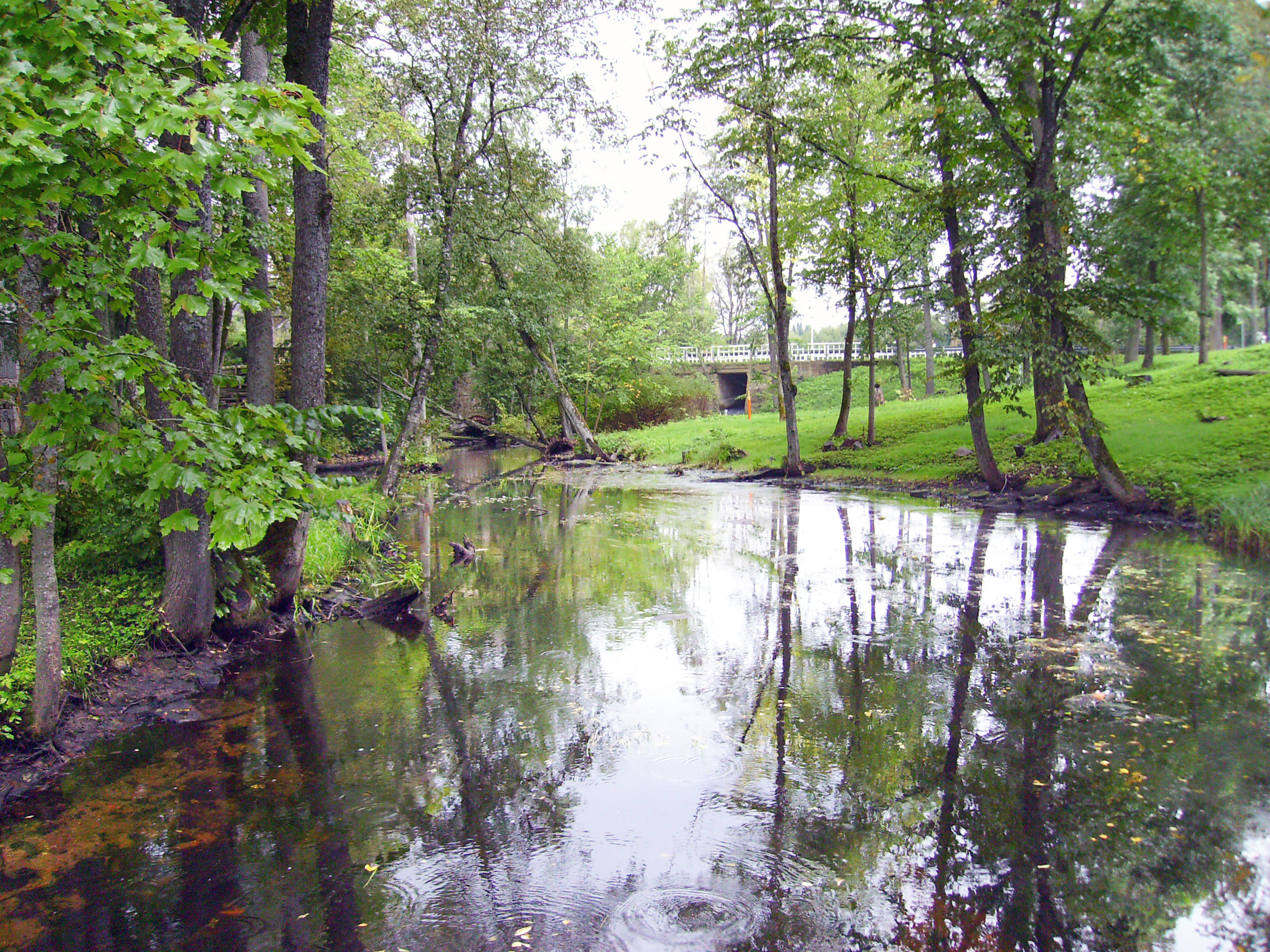
Palamuse

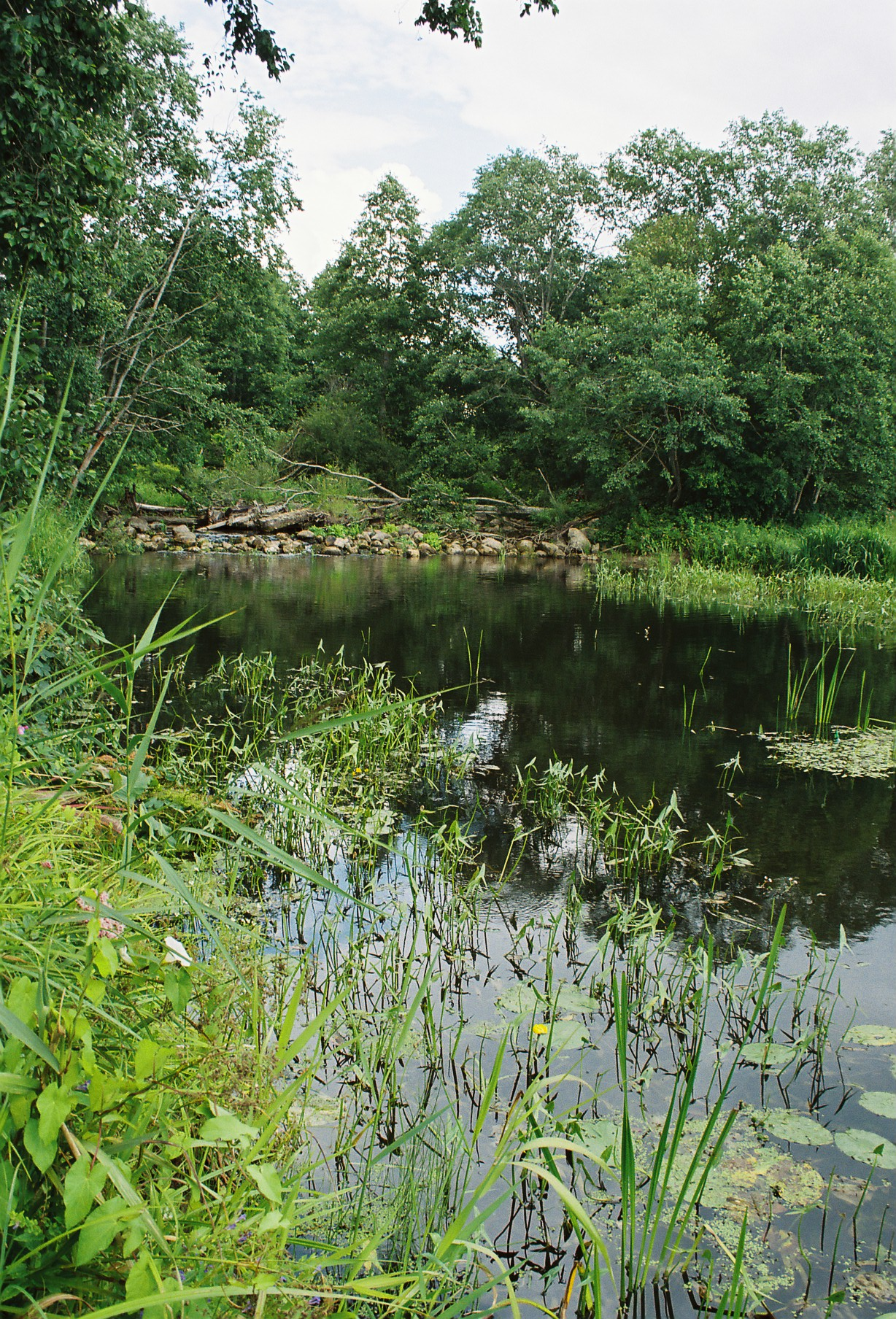
The lower course of the Amme
