= Kaiavere =

Kaiavere may refer to places in Estonia:

- Kaiavere, Jõgeva County, village in Jõgeva Parish, Jõgeva County, Estonia
- Kaiavere, Tartu County, village in Tartu Parish, Tartu County, Estonia
- Lake Kaiavere, lake in Otslava village, Tartu Parish, Tartu County
