= Lake Kuremaa =

Lake in Estonia

- Kuremaa järv (Estonian)
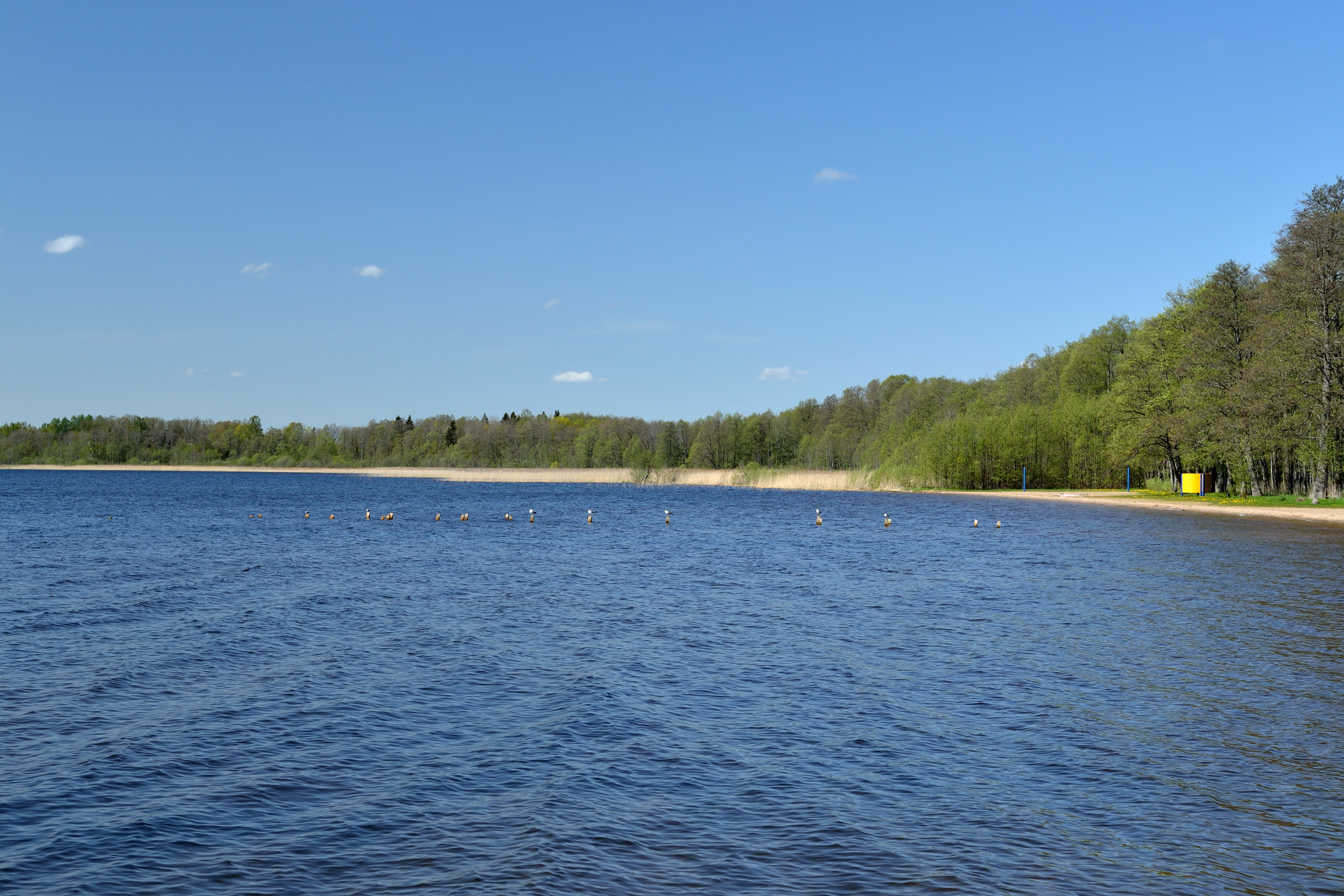

- Location within Estonia
- Location: Jõgeva Parish, Jõgeva County
- Coordinates: 58°43′N 26°33′E
- Primary outflows: Amme River
- Basin countries: Estonia
- Max. length: 4,520 meters (14,830 ft)
- Surface area: 397.7 hectares (983 acres)
- Average depth: 6.0 meters (19.7 ft)
- Max. depth: 13.0 meters (42.7 ft)
- Water volume: 21,911,000 cubic meters (773,800,000 cu ft)
- Shore length^{1}: 11,530 meters (37,830 ft)
- Surface elevation: 82.8 meters (272 ft)
- Islands: 1
- ^{1} Shore length is not a well-defined measure.

Lake Kuremaa (Estonian: Kuremaa järv or Kurema järv, German: Jenselsche See) is a lake in Estonia. It is located in the village of Änkküla in Jõgeva Parish, Jõgeva County, 2 kilometers (1.2 mi) north of Palamuse. It is the 11th-largest lake in Estonia and the second-largest lake in the Vooremaa region (after Saadjärv).

== Physical description ==
The lake has an area of 397.7 hectares (983 acres), and it has one island with an area of 0.09 hectares (0.22 acres). The lake has an average depth of 6.0 meters (19.7 ft) and a maximum depth of 13.0 meters (42.7 ft). It is 4,520 meters (14,830 ft) long, and its shoreline measures 11,530 meters (37,830 ft). It has a volume of 21,911,000 cubic meters (773,800,000 cu ft).

== Gallery ==
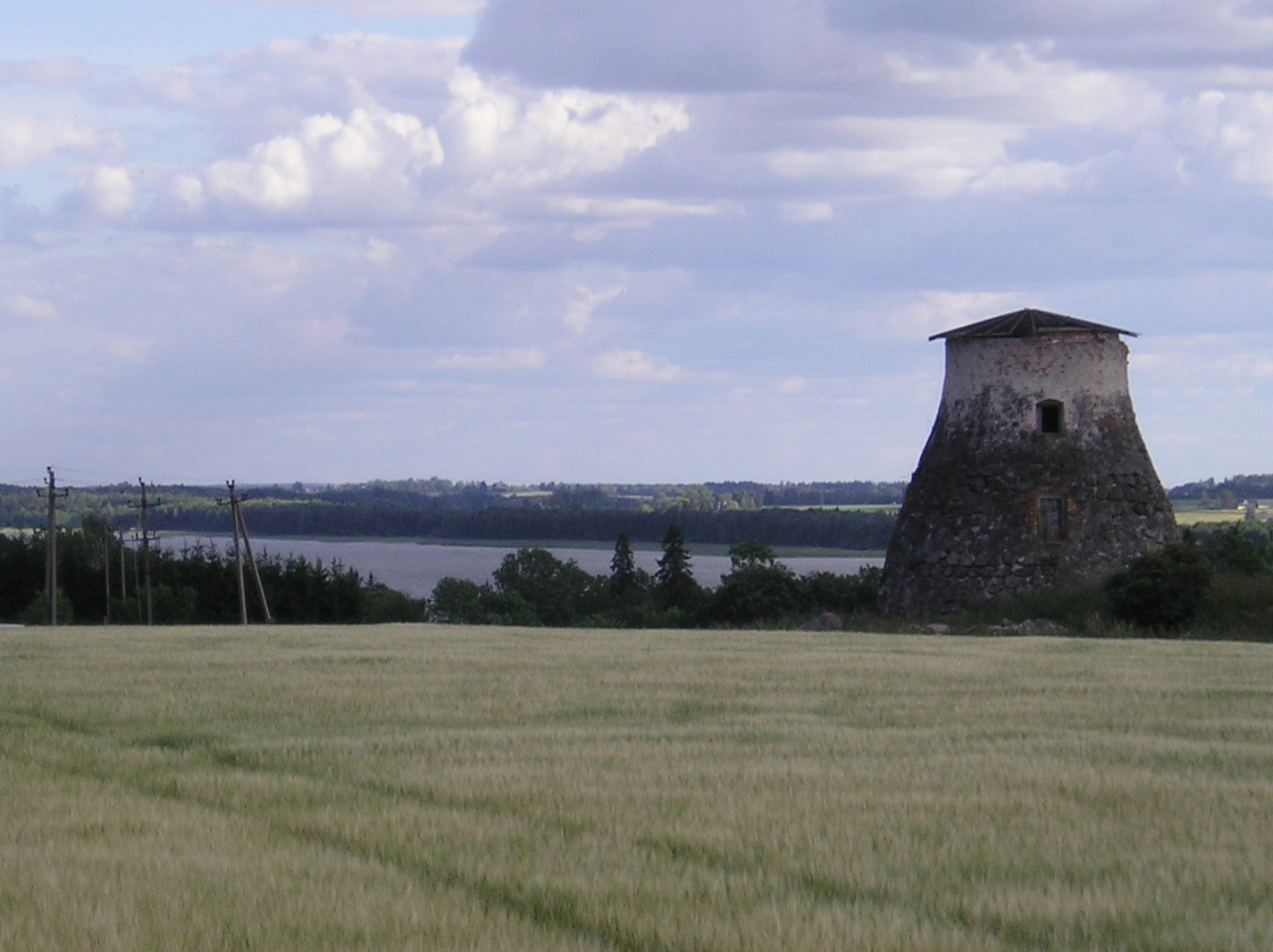
Lake Kuremaa seen from the north
