= Ice Age Centre =

Educational museum in Estonia

Ice Age Centre Jääaja Keskus
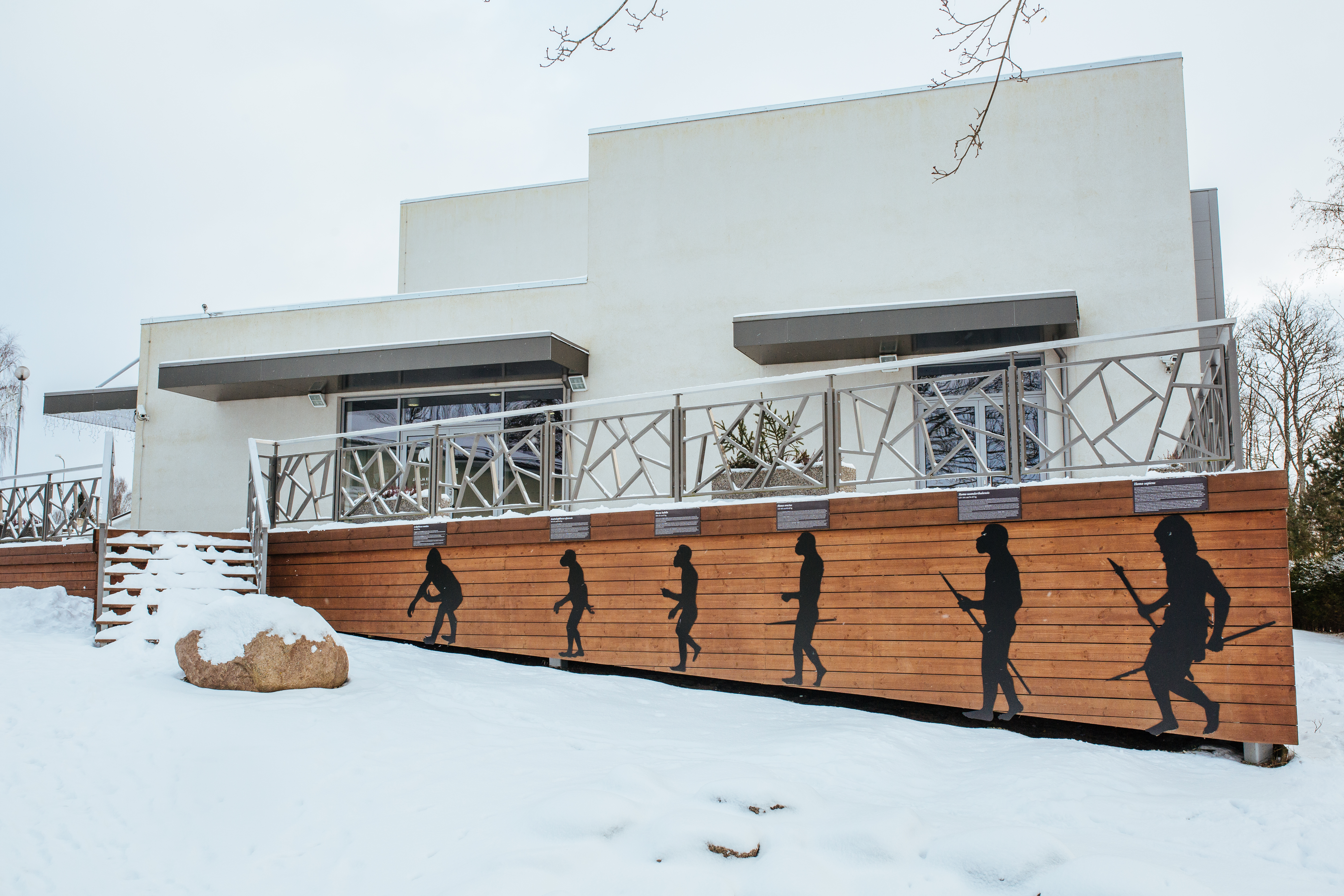
- Established: 2012
- Location: Tartu, Estonia
- Director: Sigrid Sepp
- Website: Official website

The Ice Age Centre (Estonian: Jääaja Keskus) is a museum dedicated to the understanding of ice ages, located in Äksi village, Tartu County, Estonia.

The museum popularises knowledge about the origins and dynamics of different ice ages, including their effect on the landscape, animal life, and humans, with a special focus on the impact of the latest ice age on the modern-day country Estonia. The centre was awarded the Best New Tourist Venue in Estonia in 2012.

== About the Centre ==
=== Location ===
The centre is in Aksi village, situated on the shores of Lake Saadjärv, in Tartu county, which is a two-hour drive from Tallinn, Estonia's capital. Located on the property is a lake, a small zoo and an amusement park. One of the National Geographic "Yellow Windows" is situated near the Ice Age Centre, emphasizing the importance of this region for tourists to discover Southern Estonia. The area is known for the ice age and Estonian Kalevipoeg legends.

=== Exhibitions ===
The Ice Age Centre is an interactive exhibition, exploiting three floors of educational entertainment. It's generally geared towards children, but there are activities for visitors of all ages.

On the first floor, visitors will learn about the ice ages and the animals that lived then, including the woolly mammoth. Entering the exhibition hall, the visitor first sees the ice age mammoth. Around the mammoths is a diorama, a piece of nature in which they once lived. Such a community formed in Estonia after the melting of glaciers. Here visitors can get acquainted with life-size prehistoric animals and experience an experiential overview of how the world and Estonian nature have developed over the millennia. You will also learn how humans adapted during ice ages. Children will have the opportunity to experiment with ice, including a playground that is designed as an ice age cave.

The second floor explores the impact of ice ages on Estonian landscapes, including their traces in folktales. Here the visitor be introduced to the history of Estonian nature and human settlement after the last ice age. Central to this post-glacial history of nature are the research stories of scientists, whose "storytelling" helps the visitor to read and understand the signs in natural landscapes and heritage culture.

The third floor hypothesises about the future - will there be another ice age? Are humans contributing to it through the impact of climate change? What is the attendee's ecological footprint? They will also meet a life-size polar bear, Franz.

=== Educational Programs ===
Environmental study programs are offered from kindergarten groups to high school graduates. Giving visitors first hand experience surveys of Saadjärv take place (on a raft in summer, on ice in winter), invertebrates are caught and identified, and many other interesting and educational activities are done both outdoors and indoors.

Curricula for kindergarten and first grade school focus on play. For example:

- familiarity with landforms ("How did the toboggan run?"),
- observe the adaptations of the animals to the weather,
- get to know the three states of water, animals and their habitats,
- get to know the animals that lived in the ice age and compare them with modern animals ("Is a mammoth a furry elephant?").

For older students, the focus is on active learning, which covers the following topics:

- "Ice age - an integral part of Earth's development" (glacier formation, land development history, ice age biota and human life),
- "The story of Estonian nature - post-ice age biota development" (climate change, climate periods),
- "Heritage of glaciers on the surface of Estonia" (leading boulders, landforms),
- "Post-Ice Age Nature and Man in Estonia" (climate change in Estonian areas and nature, adaptation of organisms, formation of human settlements),
- "Do you know Vooremaa?" (landforms, environment, one of the most representative networks in Europe, positioning).

=== Other Activities ===
The centre also offers raft trips on Lake Saadjärv. The raft is operated by guides who tell stories about the nature of Lake Saadjärv, the formation of Vooremaa and about the great deeds of the national hero Kalevipoeg.

Using virtual reality goggles, visitors can dive into the "Mystical Primitive Sea," of hundreds of millions of years ago and experience the life that once inhabited Estonian territories, such as giant reptiles, vigorous trilobites, giant predators, sea scorpions and nautiloids.

There is also an educational Christmas program about the life of animals in the winter and, of course, Santa Claus. Other special events (conferences, birthdays) can be organized by arrangement.

== History ==
In 2004, the idea to create a visitor center in Tartu municipality near Saadjärv, which would attract visitors to the area, but would also be a provider of nature education. The idea emanated from the Saadjärv Nature School and its then-director, Asta Tuusti. "The exhibition introduces ice ages in the context of world history, the heritage of glaciers in our landscapes and wildlife, and introduces future prospects in the context of climate change," explained Tuusti. "Äksi is a very suitable place for the ice age center. The surrounding landscape with its rounds, lakes and rocks is a legacy of ice age glaciers." Tartu rural community and mayor, Aivar Soop, supported the concept and, with community cooperation, the exposition was created, introducing the ice ages in the context of world history, glacier heritage in Estonian landscapes and wildlife, and future prospects in the context of climate change. "It is unique that one local government undertakes to establish such a large and special nature education center," said Tuusti. The entire region benefits from the thousands of tourists who visit the Centre each year. The Centre cost about 4 million euros, some of which was a grant from the European Regional Development Fund.
