= Monument of the War of Independence =

Monument in Estonia

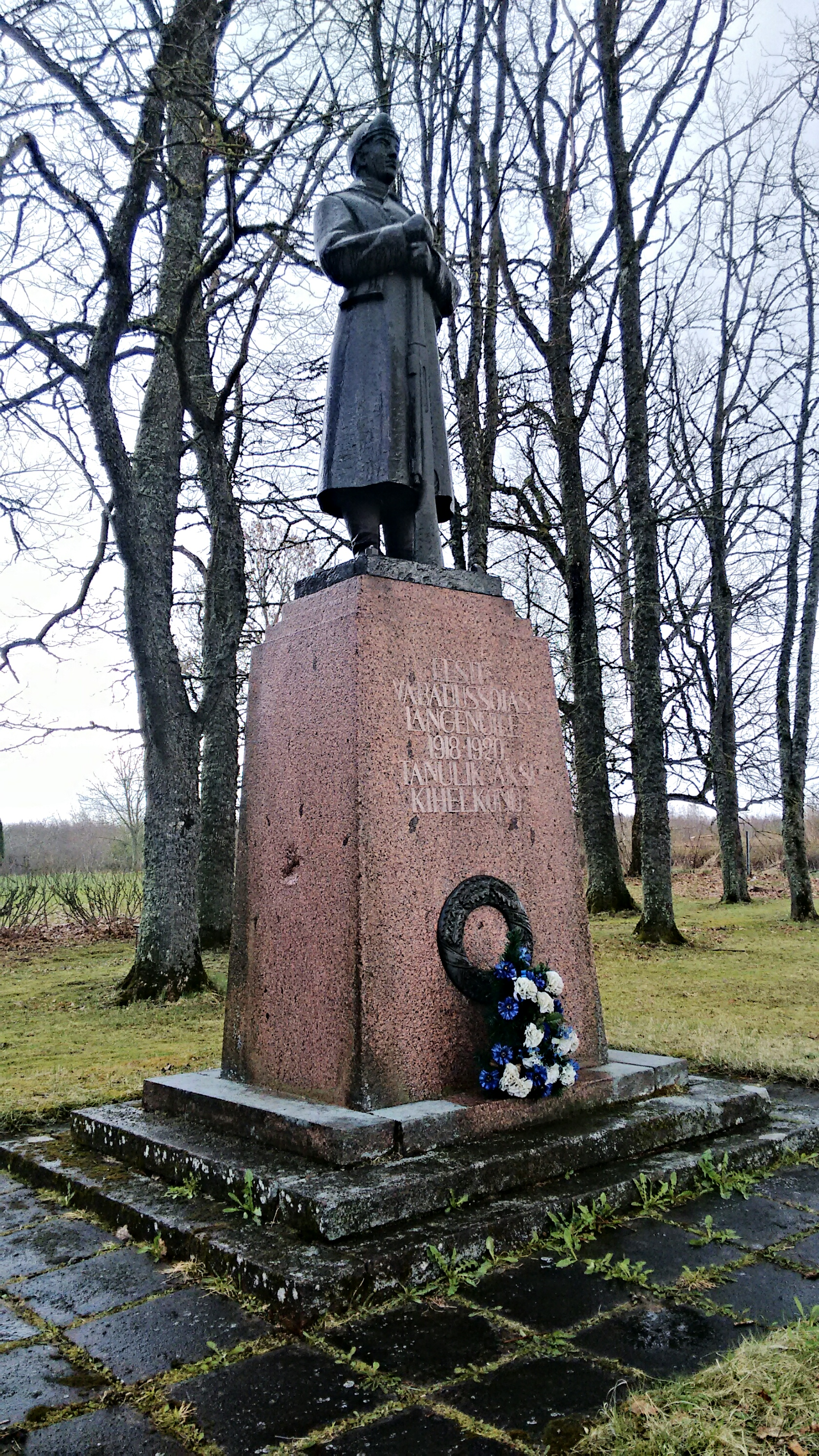
- The Monument is located in the village of Voldi, near the northern end of Äksi village.
- Location: Voldi, Tartu Parish, Estonia
- Coordinates: 58°31′44″N 26°38′19″E

The Äksi Monument of the War of Independence is a monument commemorating the Estonian War of Independence (Estonian: Vabadussõda) from 1918 to 1920. It is located in Tartu Parish in the village of Voldi, near the northern end of the village of Äksi where the road Äksi-Kukulinna joins the road Tartu-Jogeva-Aravete.

== History ==
The monument to the fallen from the region of Äksi was opened on June 28, 1925. Twenty years later, the figure on the top was demolished. A replica of the statue was made and the monument reopened on August 27, 1989, roughly a year after the government of the Estonian SSR declared its sovereignty from the Soviet Union during the Singing Revolution.

== Description ==
From both streets, stone paths lead over a meadow to the left and the front side of the monument. They end at a slight elevation, where four steps each lead to a square surface completely covered with stone slabs. In the middle, there is a three-step pedestal, on which a granite column – which also tapers above with a three-step staircase – stands. On the top, a simple soldier made of bronze is placed; he holds a rifle in his hands.

On the front side of the column, there is an oak leaves wreath made of bronze in the lower half. In the upper half, there is a text engraved with the year of the Revolutionary War and a reference to the location:

Eesti

Vabadussõjas
Langenuile
1918–1920
Tanulik Äksi

Kihelkond

On the back of the column, the names of 34 victims are engraved.

== Sources ==
- Kultuurimälestiste riiklik register: 27114 Vabadussõja mälestussammas
