= Lake Elistvere =

Lake in Estonia

- Elistvere järv (Estonian)
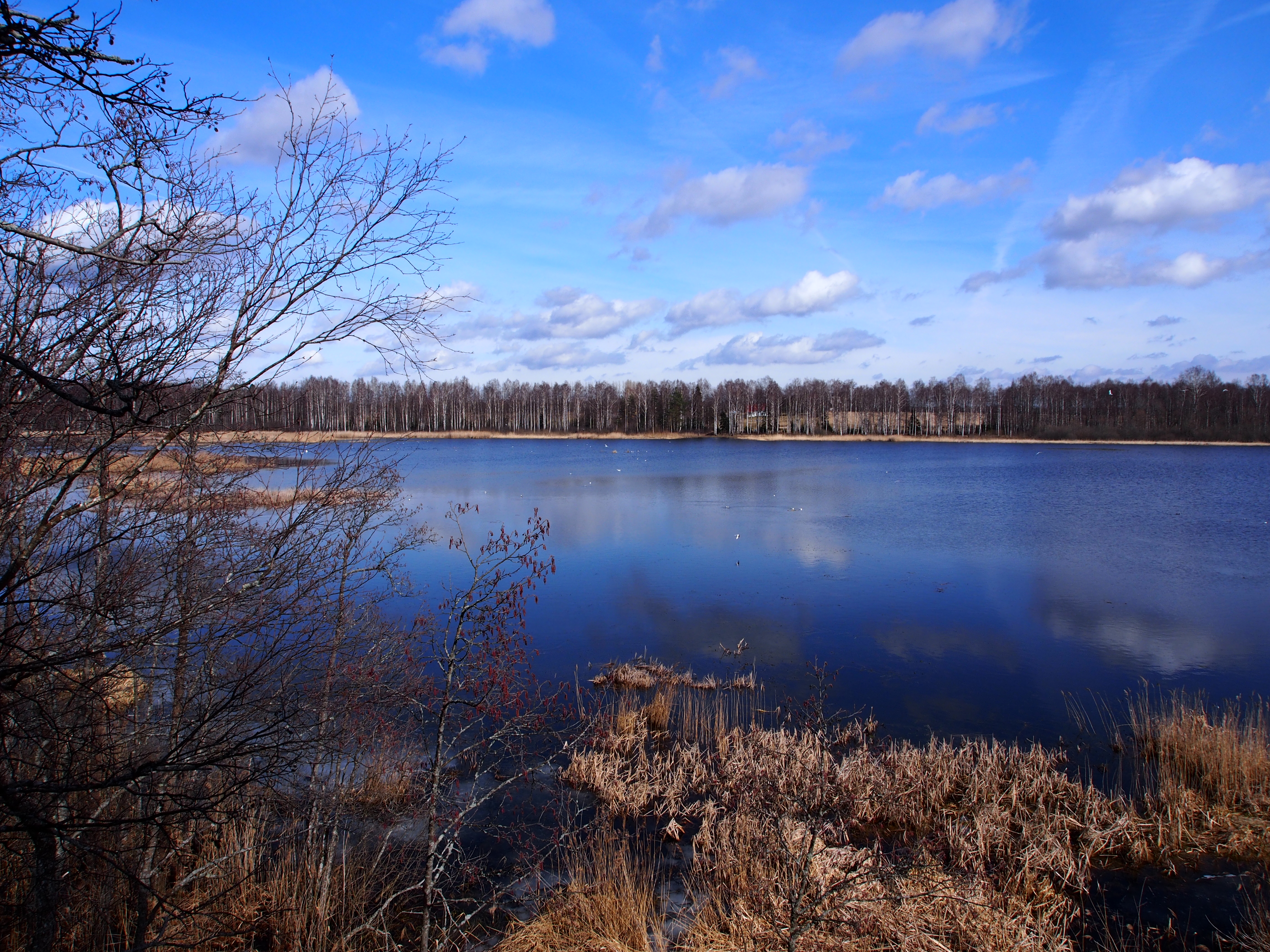

- Location within Estonia
- Location: Tartu Parish, Tartu County, Estonia
- Coordinates: 58.574722°N 26.703888°E
- Basin countries: Estonia
- Max. length: 2,900 meters (9,500 ft)
- Surface area: 133.4 hectares (330 acres)
- Average depth: 2.0 meters (6 ft 7 in)
- Max. depth: 3.5 meters (11 ft)
- Water volume: 3,534,000 cubic meters (124,800,000 cu ft)
- Shore length^{1}: 11,280 meters (37,010 ft)
- Surface elevation: 49.6 meters (163 ft)
- ^{1} Shore length is not a well-defined measure.

Lake Elistvere (Estonian: Elistvere järv, also Kuru järv) is a lake in Estonia. It is split among the villages of Elistvere, Juula, Kaiavere, and Lilu in Tartu Parish, Tartu County.

== Physical description ==
The lake has an area of 133.4 hectares (330 acres). The lake has an average depth of 2.0 meters (6 ft 7 in) and a maximum depth of 3.5 meters (11 ft). It is 2,900 meters (9,500 ft) long, and its shoreline measures 11,280 meters (37,010 ft). It has a volume of 3,534,000 cubic meters (124,800,000 cu ft).

== See also ==
- List of lakes of Estonia
