= Änkküla =

Village in Estonia

Coordinates: 58°42′N 26°32′E

- Village
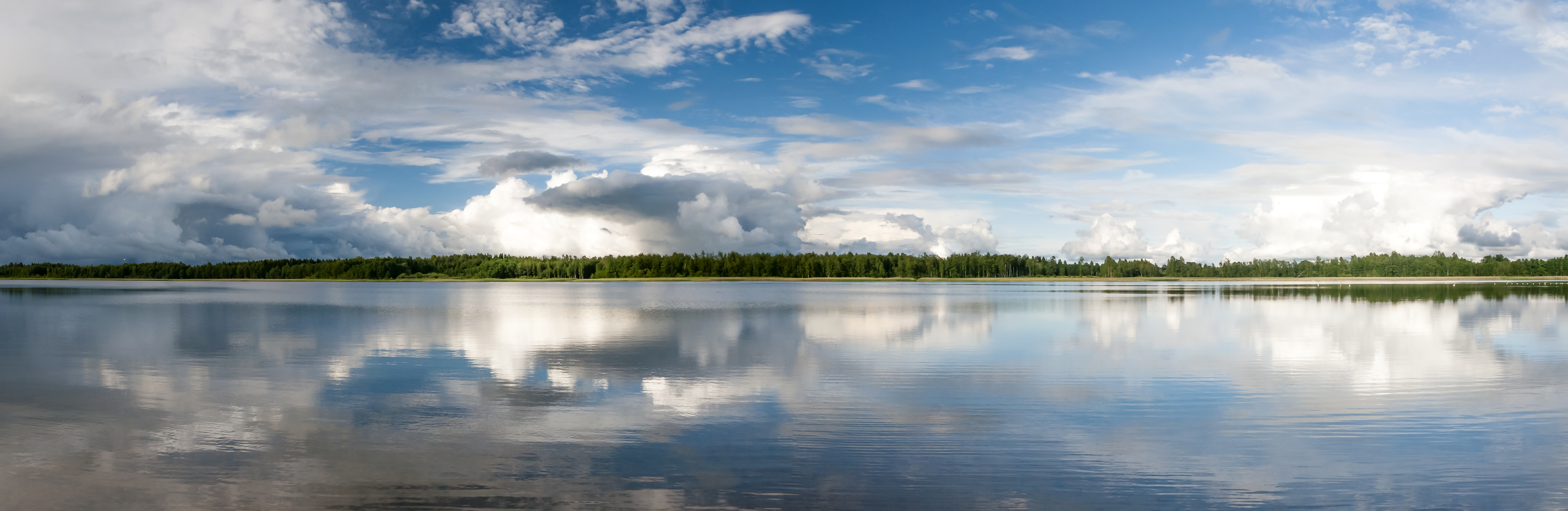
- Lake Kuremaa
- Interactive map of Änkküla
- Country: Estonia
- County: Jõgeva County
- Parish: Jõgeva Parish
- Time zone: UTC+2 (EET)
  - Summer (DST): UTC+3 (EEST)

Änkküla is a village in Jõgeva Parish, Jõgeva County in eastern Estonia.

Lake Kuremaa is administratively on the territory of Änkküla.
