= Vahi, Tartu County (village) =

Village in Estonia

- Village
- Location within Estonia
- Coordinates: 58.592222222222°N 26.718611111111°E
- Country: Estonia
- County: Tartu County
- Parish: Tartu Parish
- Time zone: UTC+2 (EET)
  - Summer (DST): UTC+3 (EEST)

Vahi was a village in Tabivere Parish, Jõgeva County (1991–2017) and in Tartu Parish, Tartu County (2017–2022) in Estonia. The village of Vahi was dissolved on 4 July 2022 and its territories were merged with the villages of Otslava and Lilu.
