= Äksi =

Borough in Estonia

- Small borough
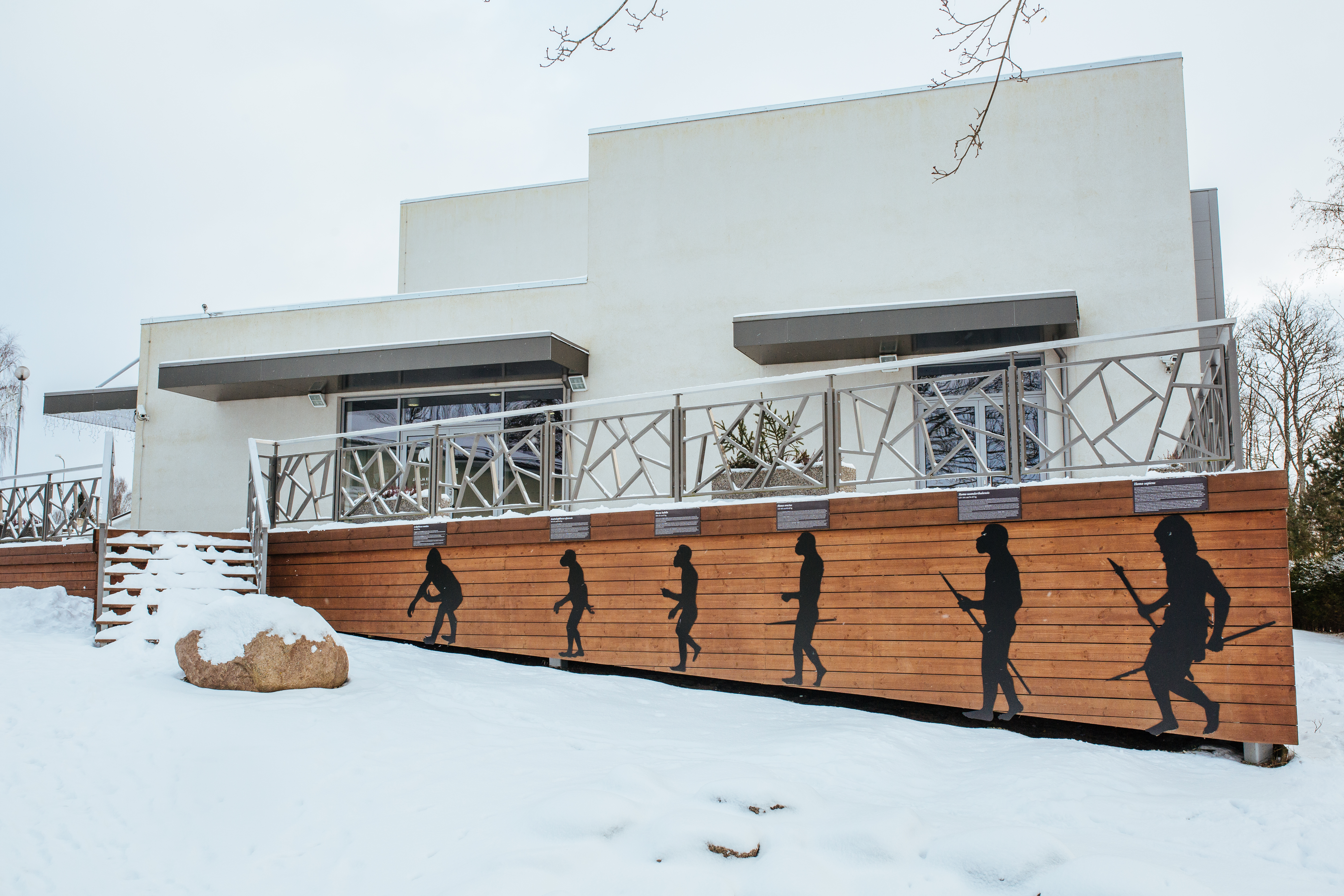
- Ice Age Centre, Äksi

- Location in Estonia
- Coordinates: 58°31′23″N 26°40′08″E
- Country: Estonia
- County: Tartu County
- Municipality: Tartu Parish

Population (01.01.2020)
  - Total: 480

Äksi is a small borough (Estonian: alevik) in Tartu Parish, Tartu County in Estonia. It is located on the southern shore of Lake Saadjärv, and has a population of 480 (as of 1 January 2020). From the Middle Ages until the first half of the 20th century, Äksi was also known by variants of its German language name Ecks.

The Ice Age Centre, a museum about the latest ice age, is located in Äksi.

There is a monument for the fallen soldiers of the Estonian War of Independence (1918-1920) in Äksi.

== Gallery ==
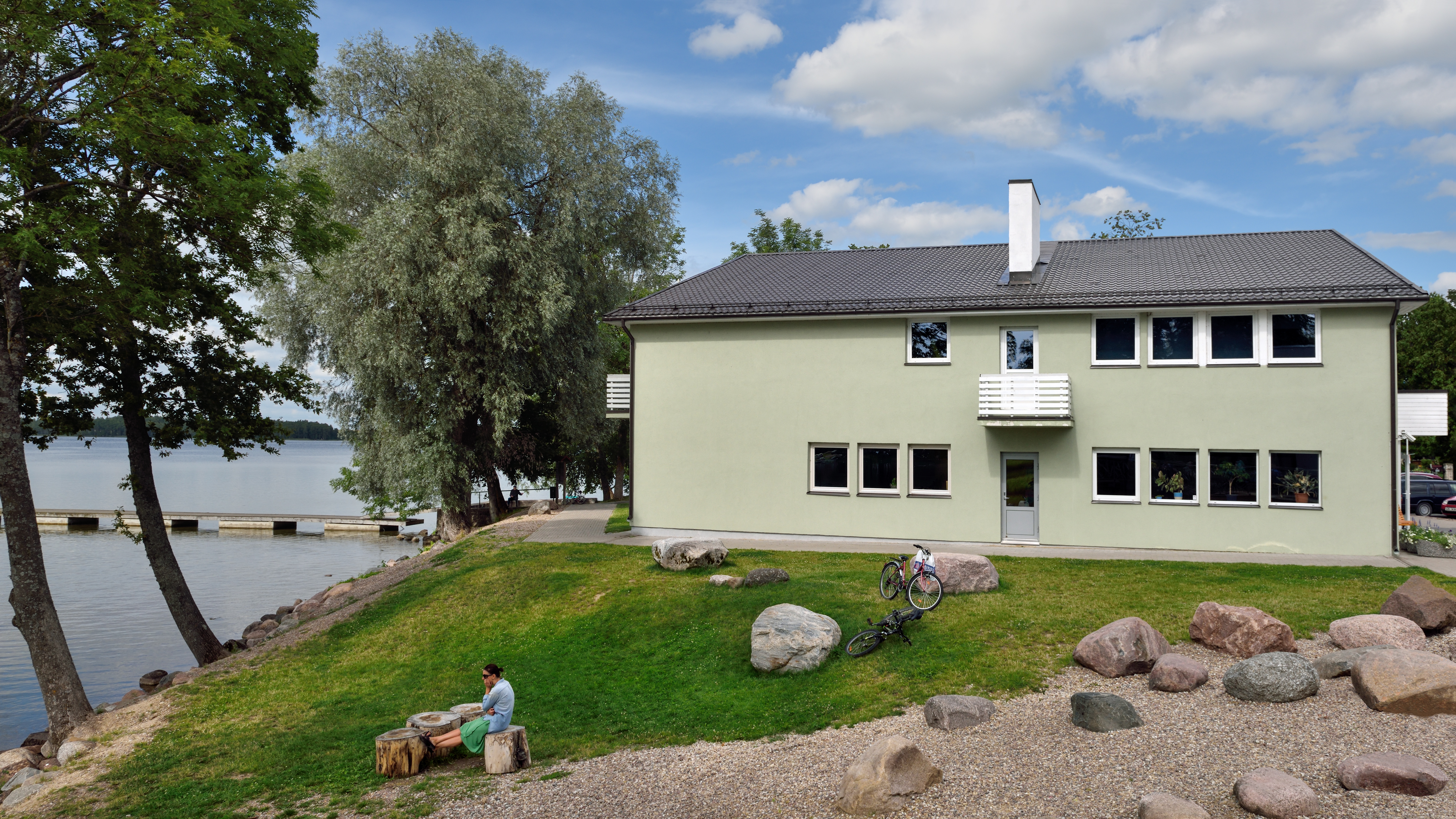
Building at Saadjärv lakeside

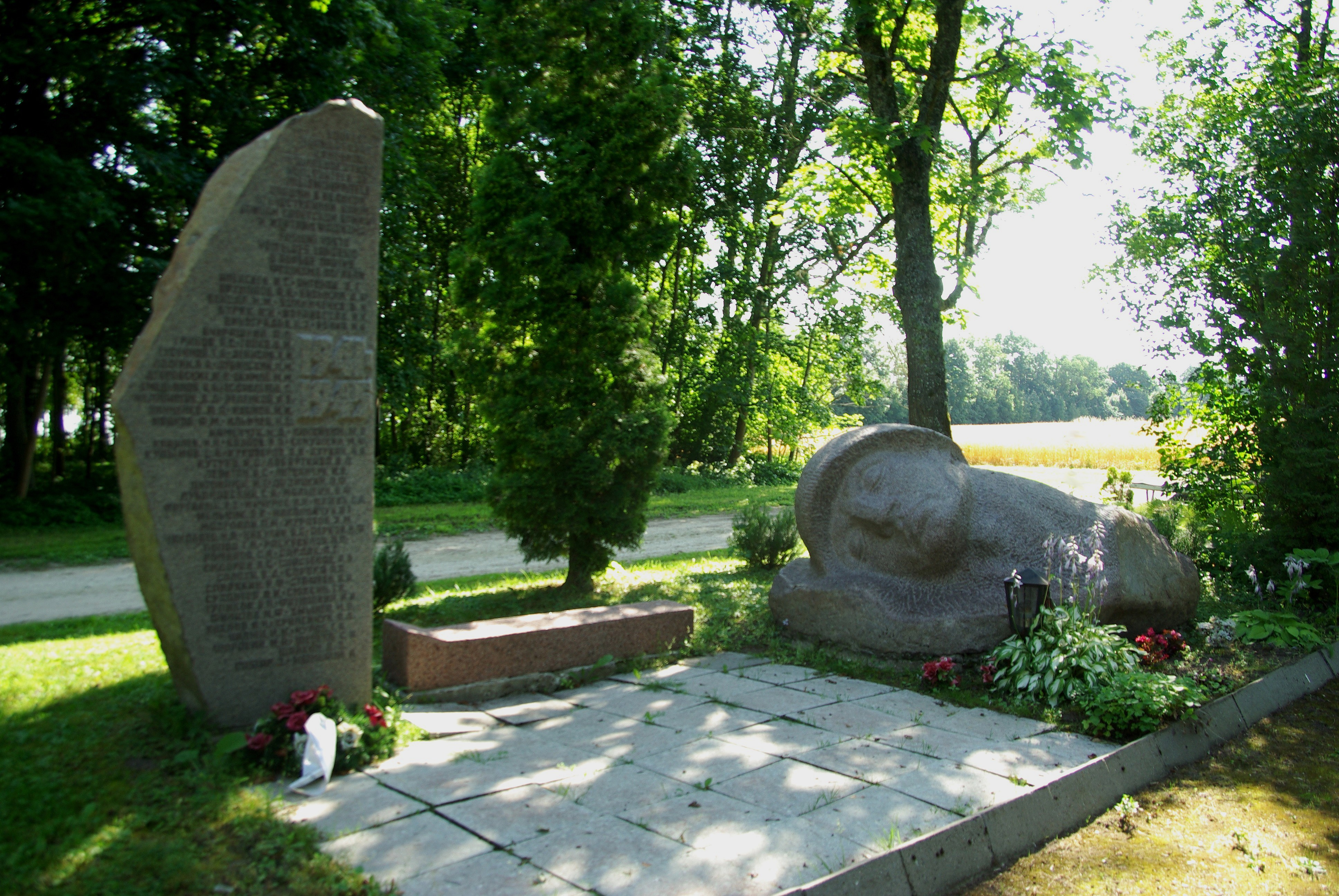
Äksi cemetery

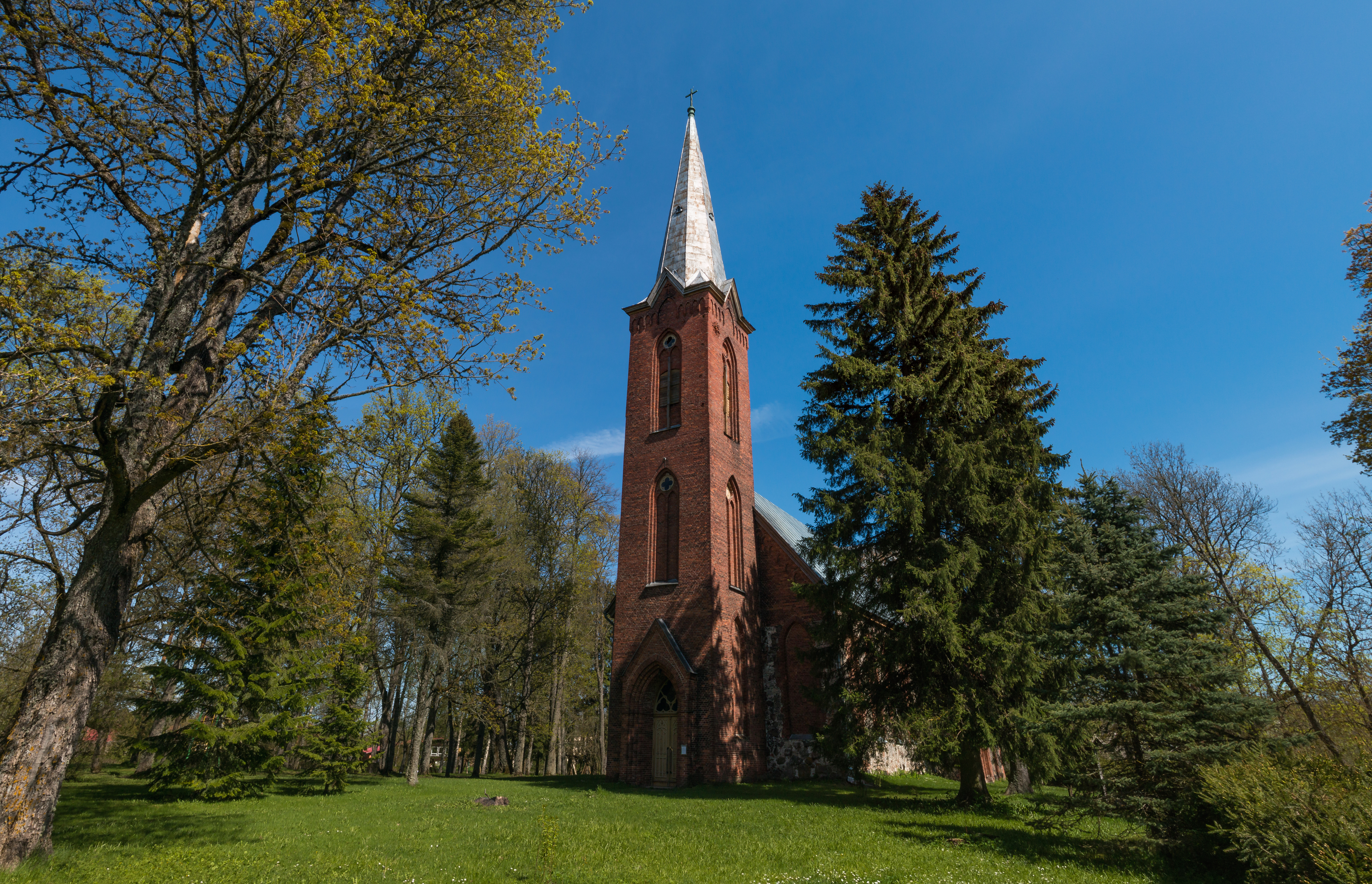
Church of Andrew the Apostle
