= Lake Kaiavere =

Lake in Estonia

- Kaiavere järv (Estonian)
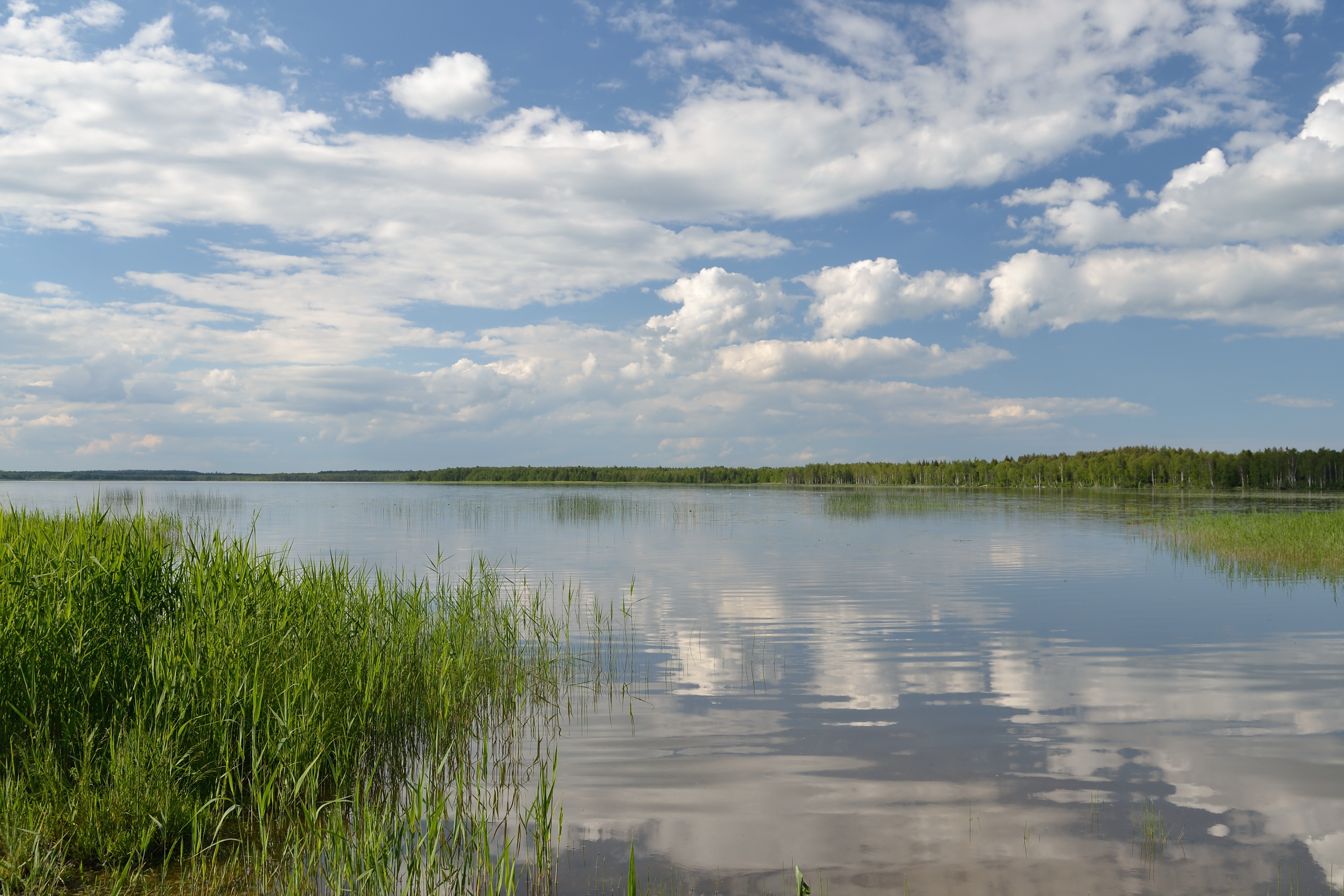

- Location within Estonia
- Location: Tartu County, Estonia
- Coordinates: 58°36′15″N 26°40′30″E
- Basin countries: Estonia
- Max. length: 3,610 meters (11,840 ft)
- Surface area: 246.8 hectares (610 acres)
- Average depth: 2.9 meters (9 ft 6 in)
- Max. depth: 4.9 meters (16 ft)
- Water volume: 7,206,000 cubic meters (254,500,000 cu ft)
- Shore length^{1}: 8,410 meters (27,590 ft)
- Surface elevation: 51.8 meters (170 ft)
- ^{1} Shore length is not a well-defined measure.

Lake Kaiavere (Estonian: Kaiavere järv) is a lake in Estonia. It is mostly located in the village of Otslava in Tartu Parish, Tartu County, with a smaller part in the neighboring village of Kaiavere.

== Geography ==
The lake has an area of 246.8 hectares (610 acres). The lake has an average depth of 2.9 meters (9 ft 6 in) and a maximum depth of 4.9 meters (16 ft). It is 3,610 meters (11,840 ft) long, and its shoreline measures 8,410 meters (27,590 ft). It has a volume of 7,206,000 cubic meters (254,500,000 cu ft).

The area around the lake is relatively low, mostly covered by wet meadows. The shores are low and muddy, with some quaking bogs at the ends of the lake. The northeastern shore is peaty, and in the southwest there are also sandy and gravelly shorelines. Deeper in the lake, the bottom is covered by a layer of mud. Among waterbirds, great crested grebes, mallards, and tufted ducks nest on the lake.

== See also ==
- List of lakes of Estonia
