= Lake Raigastvere =

Lake in Estonia

- Raigastvere järv (Estonian)
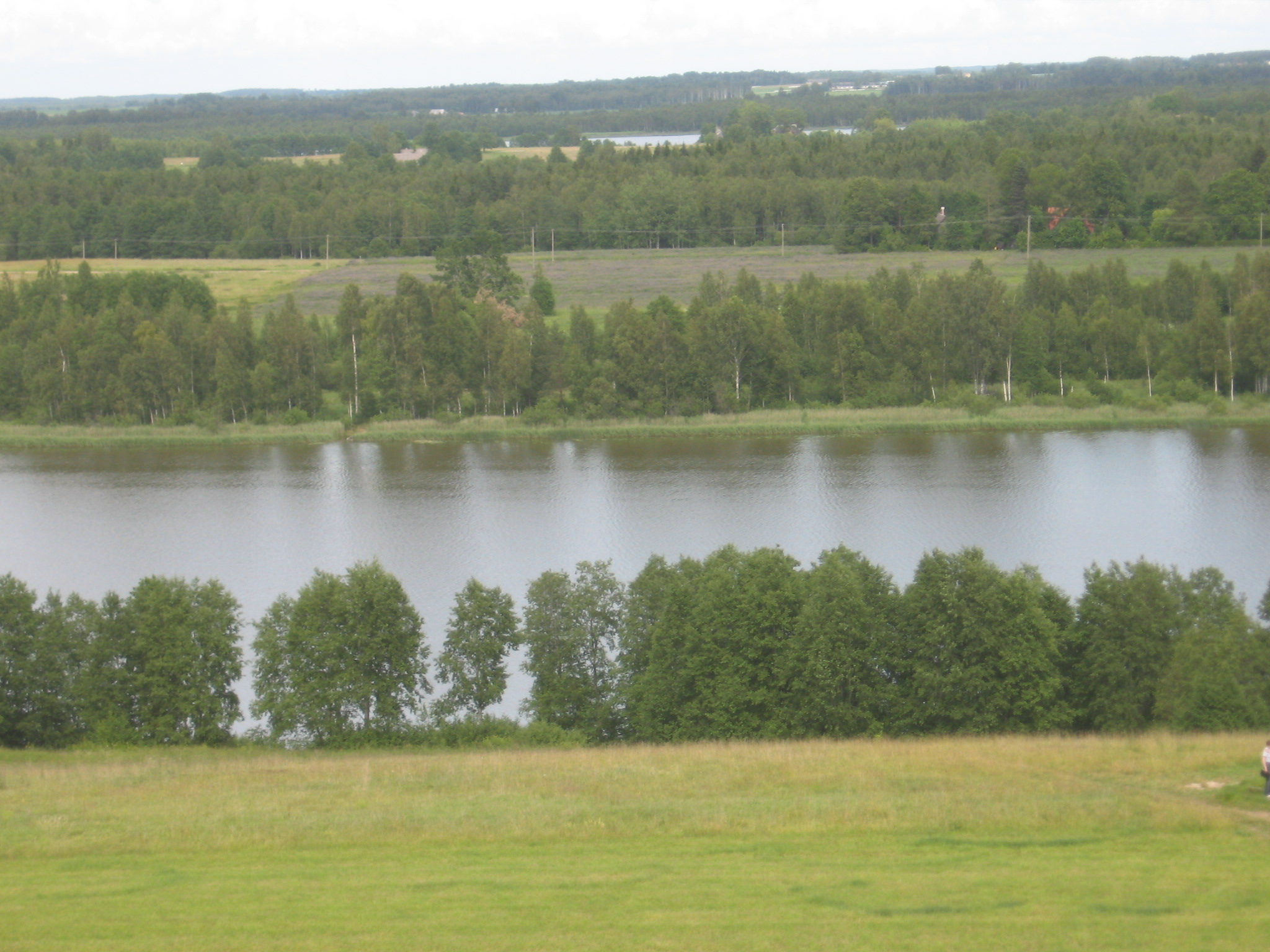

- Location within Estonia
- Coordinates: 58°35′28″N 26°39′20″E
- Basin countries: Estonia
- Max. length: 3,850 meters (12,630 ft)
- Surface area: 111.2 hectares (275 acres)
- Average depth: 3.3 meters (11 ft)
- Max. depth: 4.6 meters (15 ft)
- Water volume: 3,649,000 cubic meters (128,900,000 cu ft)
- Shore length^{1}: 8,310 meters (27,260 ft)
- Surface elevation: 50.1 meters (164 ft)
- ^{1} Shore length is not a well-defined measure.

Lake Raigastvere (Estonian: Raigastvere järv) is a lake in Estonia. It is mostly located in the village of Raigastvere in Tartu Parish, Tartu County, with a smaller part in neighboring Kärksi.

== Physical description ==
The lake has an area of 111.2 hectares (275 acres). The lake has an average depth of 3.3 meters (11 ft) and a maximum depth of 4.6 meters (15 ft). It is 3,850 meters (12,630 ft) long, and its shoreline measures 8,310 meters (27,260 ft). It has a volume of 3,649,000 cubic meters (128,900,000 cu ft).

== See also ==
- List of lakes in Estonia
