= Palamuse =

Borough in Estonia

- Small borough
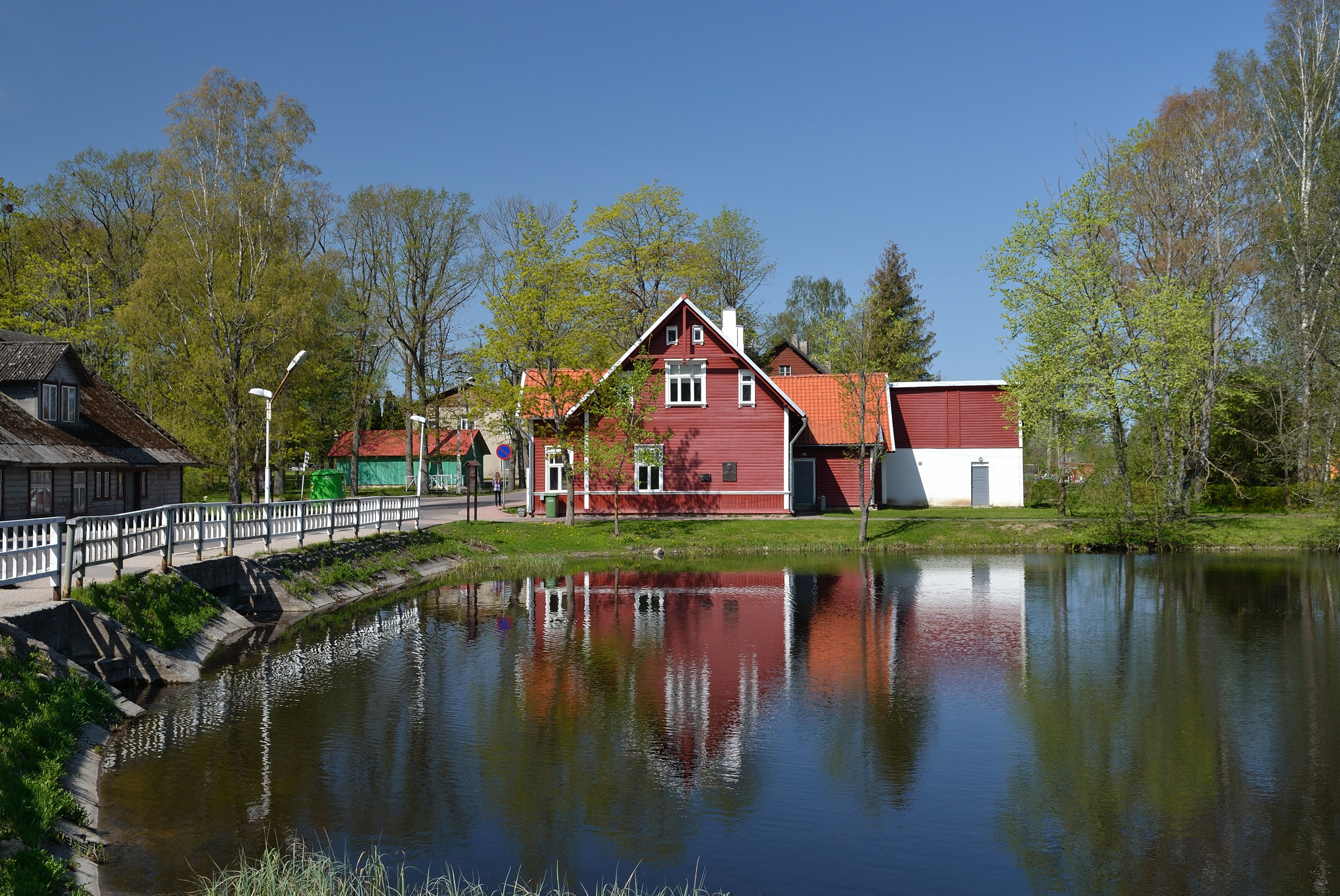
- Palamuse impounded lake on the Amme River

- Location in Estonia
- Coordinates: 58°41′05″N 26°35′03″E
- Country: Estonia
- County: Jõgeva County
- Municipality: Jõgeva Parish
- First mentioned: 20 November 1234

Population (1 January 2011)
  - Total: 551

Palamuse is a small borough (Estonian: alevik) in Jõgeva County, in Jõgeva Parish, Estonia, located about 12 km (7 mi) southeast of the town of Jõgeva. It is passed by the Amme River. With a population of 551 (as of 1 January 2011)

Palamuse was the biggest settlement and the administrative centre of Palamuse Parish.

Palamuse is best known for being depicted in the Oskar Luts' 1912–1913 novel Spring (Kevade) as the settlement called "Paunvere". The 1969 film adaptation Spring was also filmed in Palamuse. His brother, the filmmaker Theodor Luts (1896–1980), was born in Palamuse.

Palamuse was first mentioned in a letter by Pope Gregory IX on 20 November 1234.

== Palamuse Church ==
The settlement evolved around St. Bartholomew's Church, which was built in 1234 by the monks of Kärkna Abbey. The church was reworked in the Gothic style in the 15th century. Its tower was added in the 19th century. The interior furnishings of the church date from 1929.

== Gallery ==
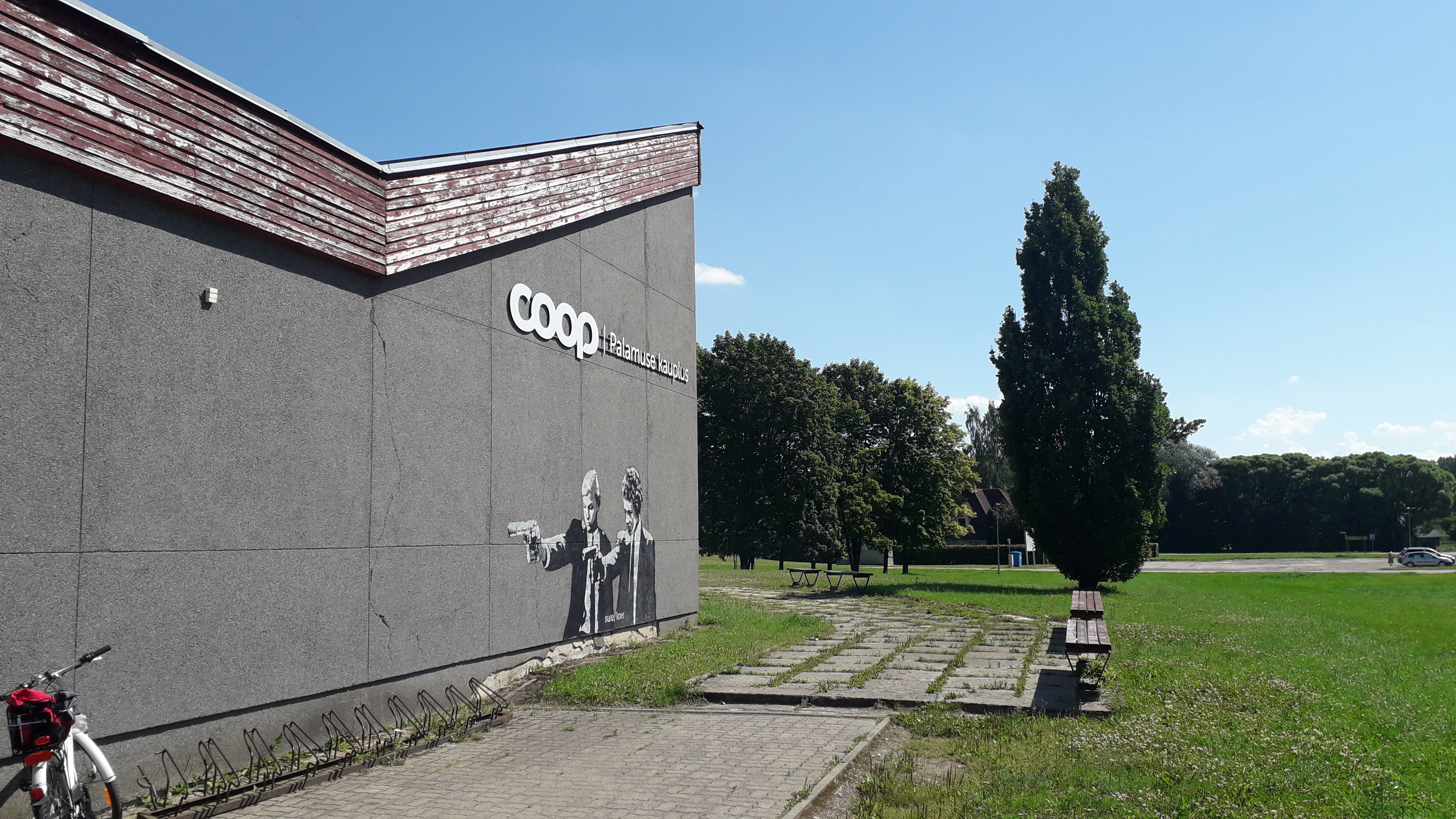
Palamuse, graffiti which depicts the characters in Oskar Luts' novel

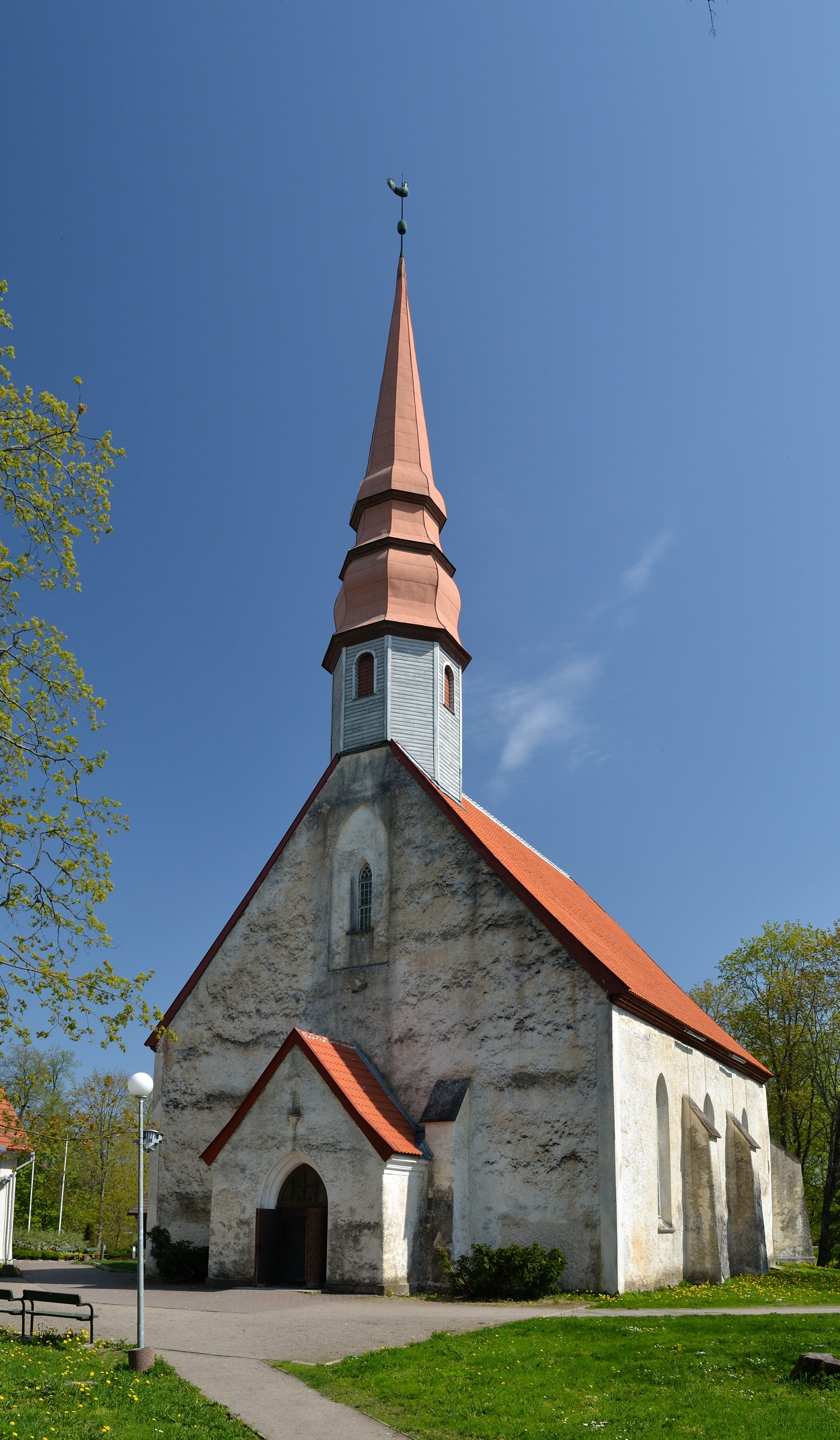
Palamuse church

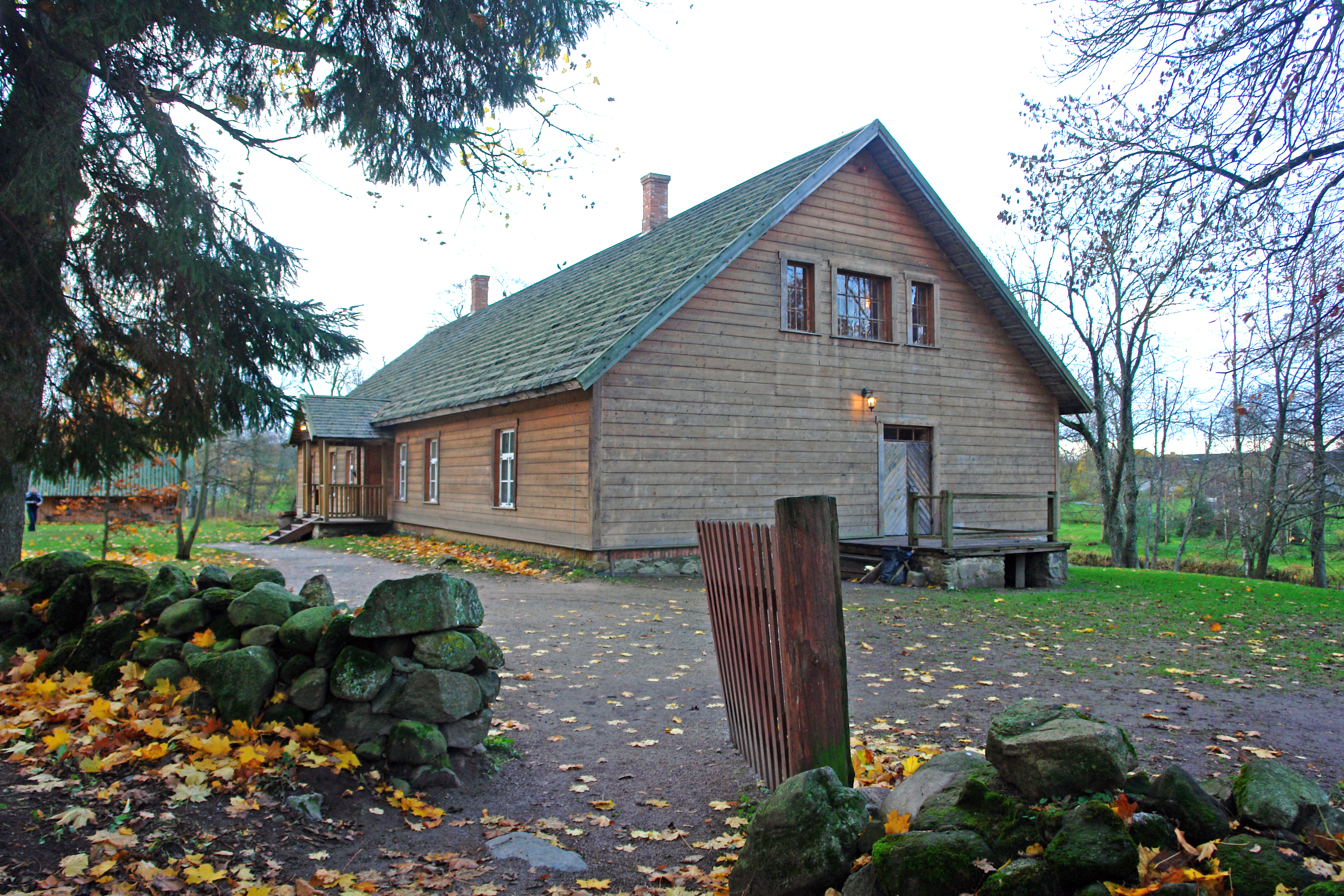
Palamuse parish school, now the Palamuse Museum

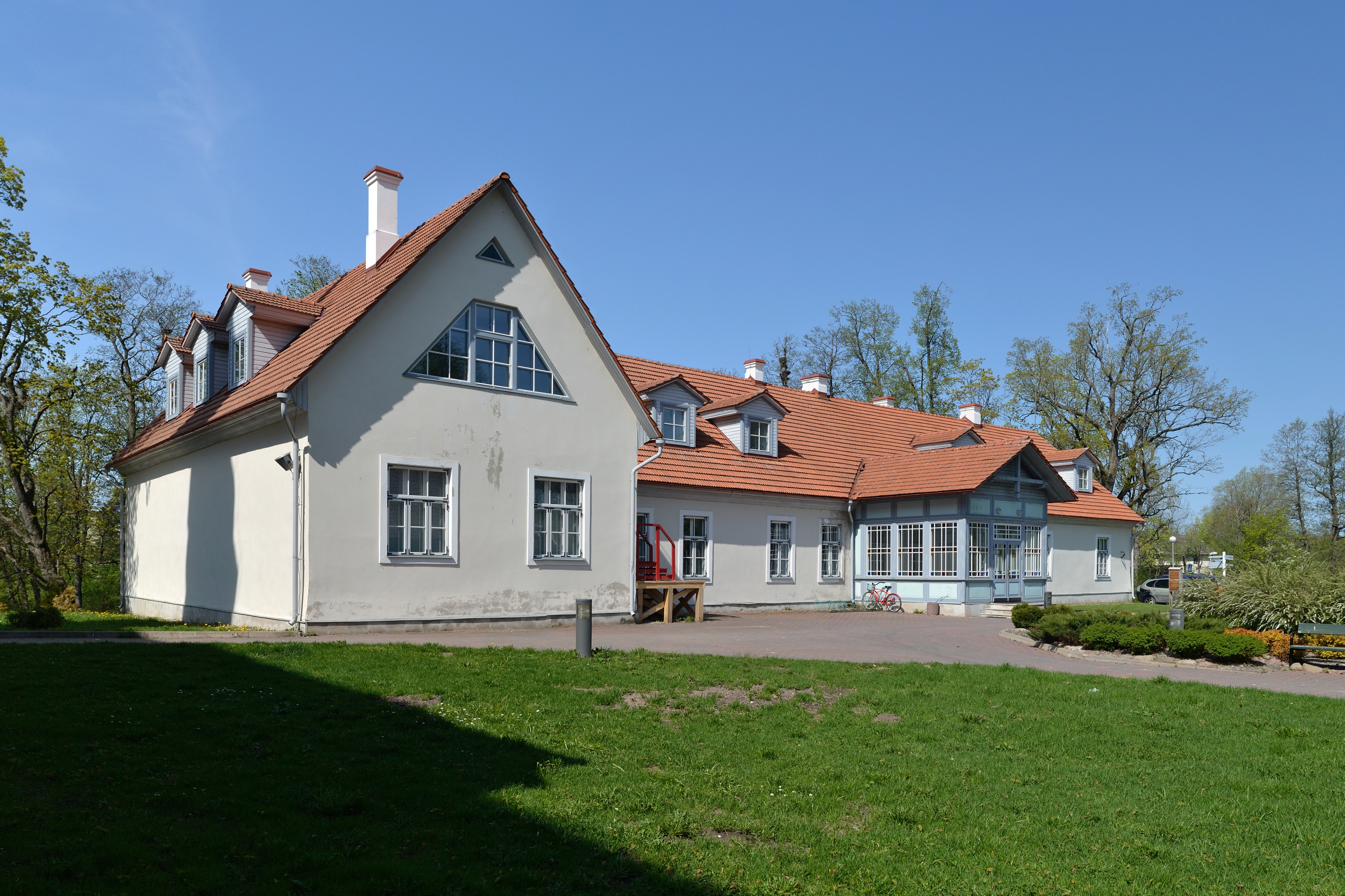
Palamuse Rectory

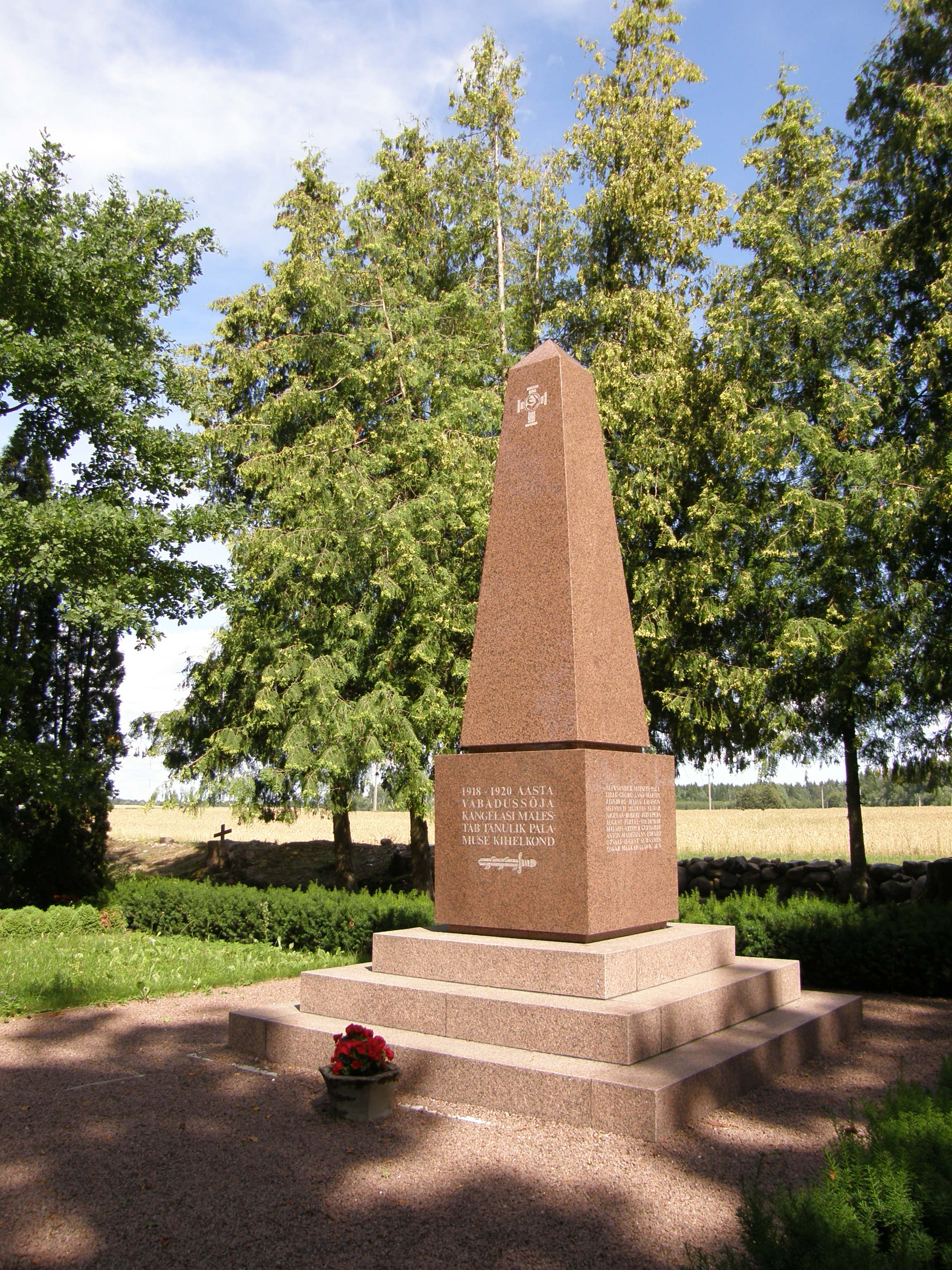
War of Independence memorial

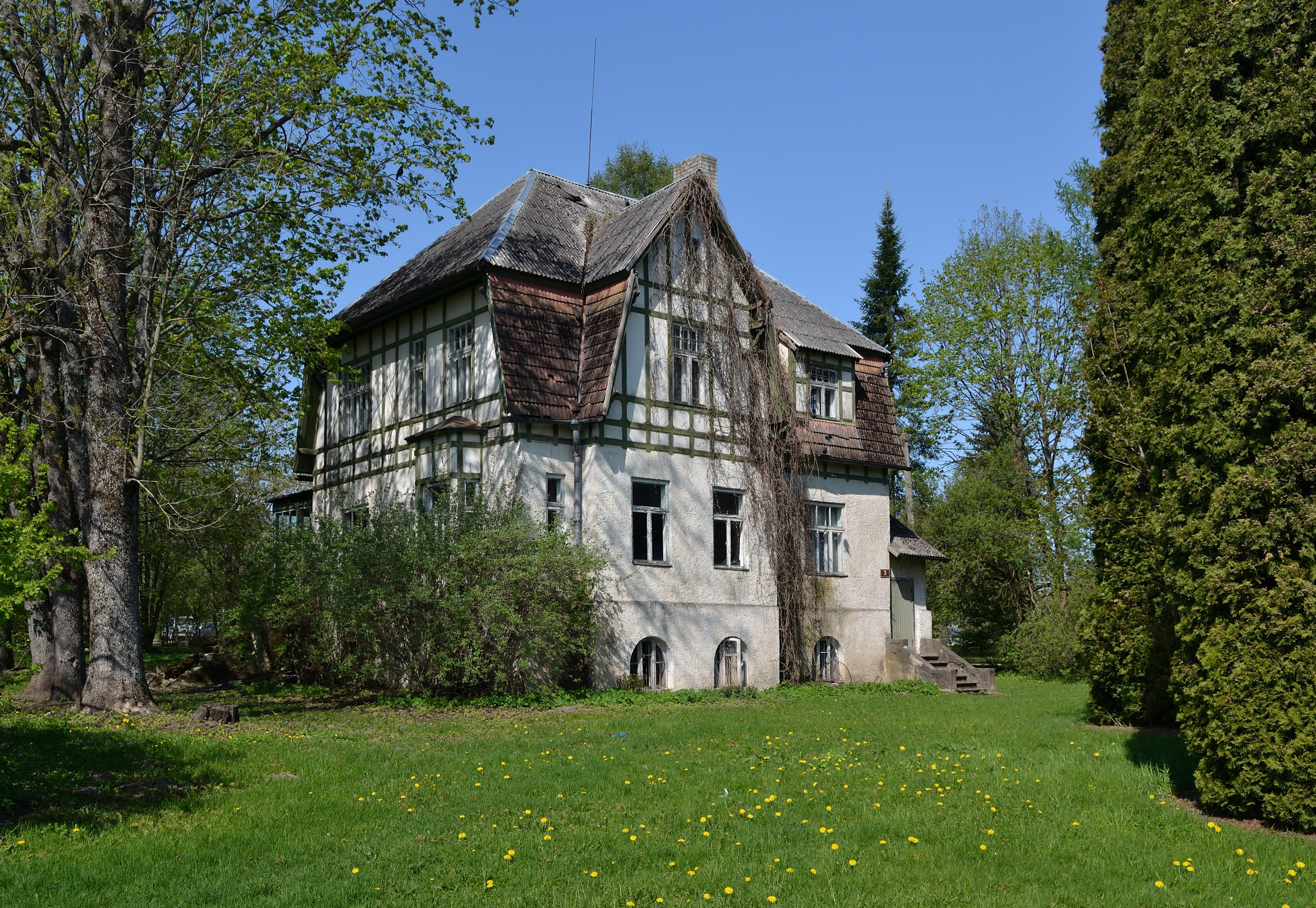
Goldberg villa

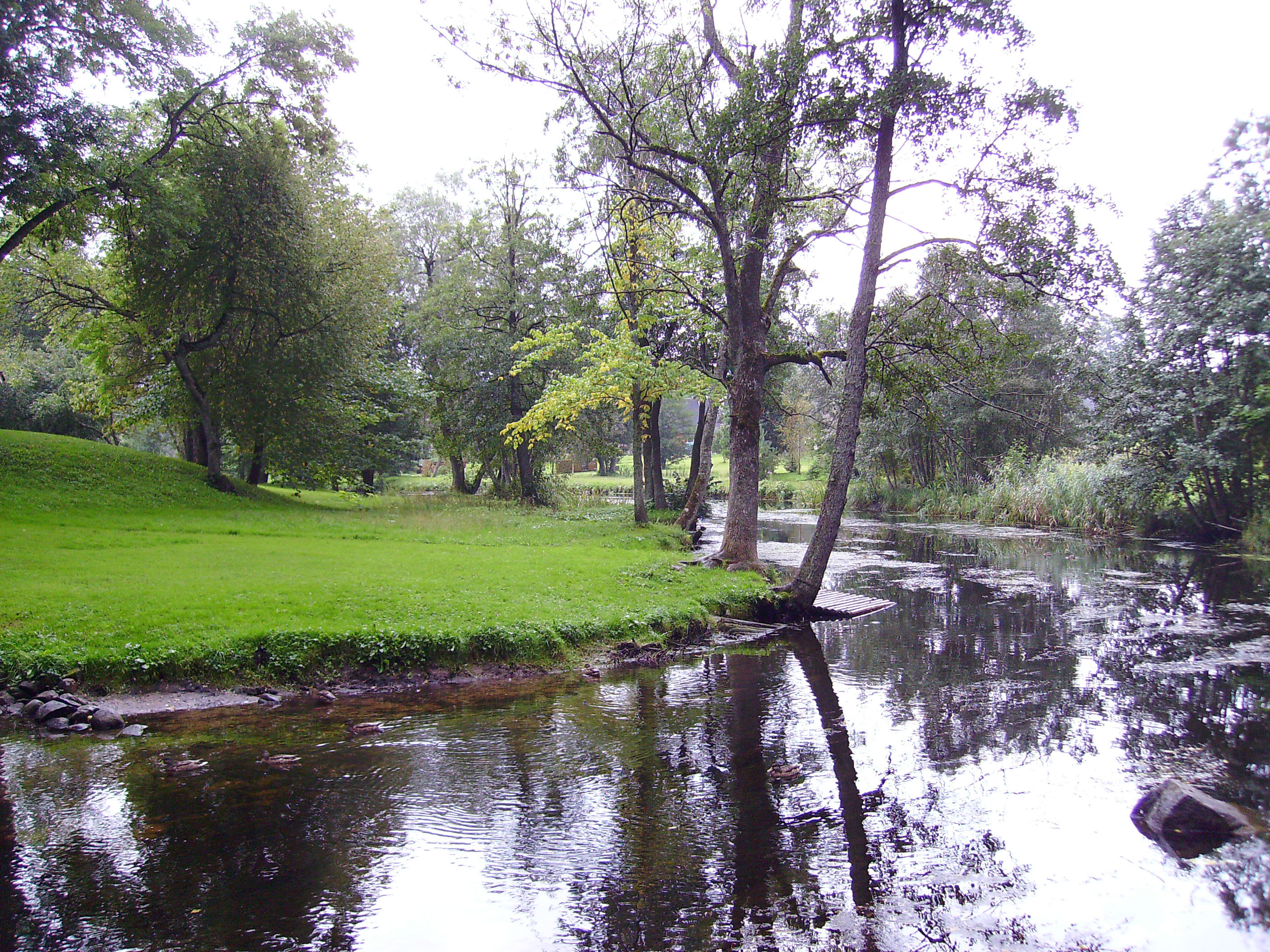
Amme River

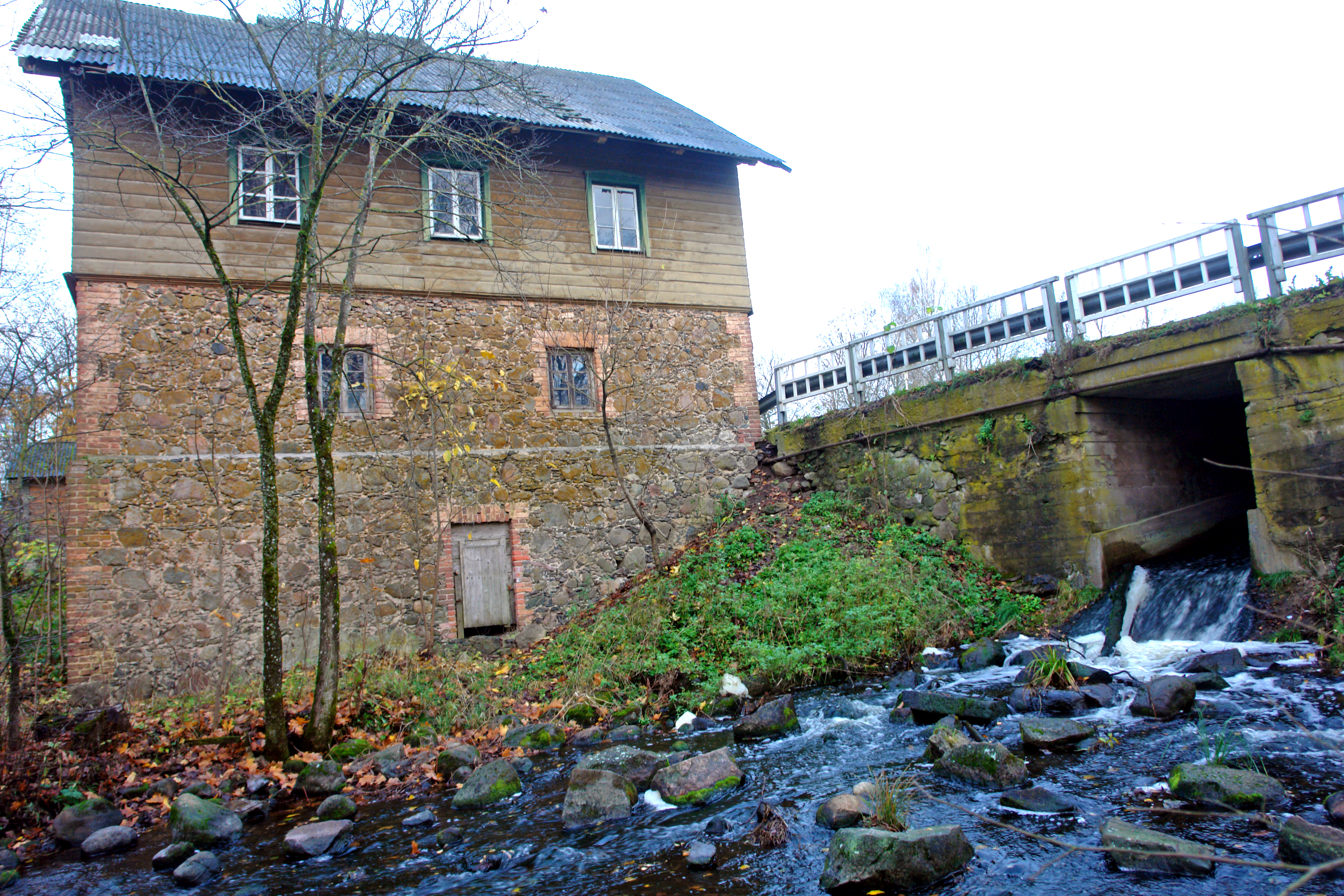
Palamuse watermill

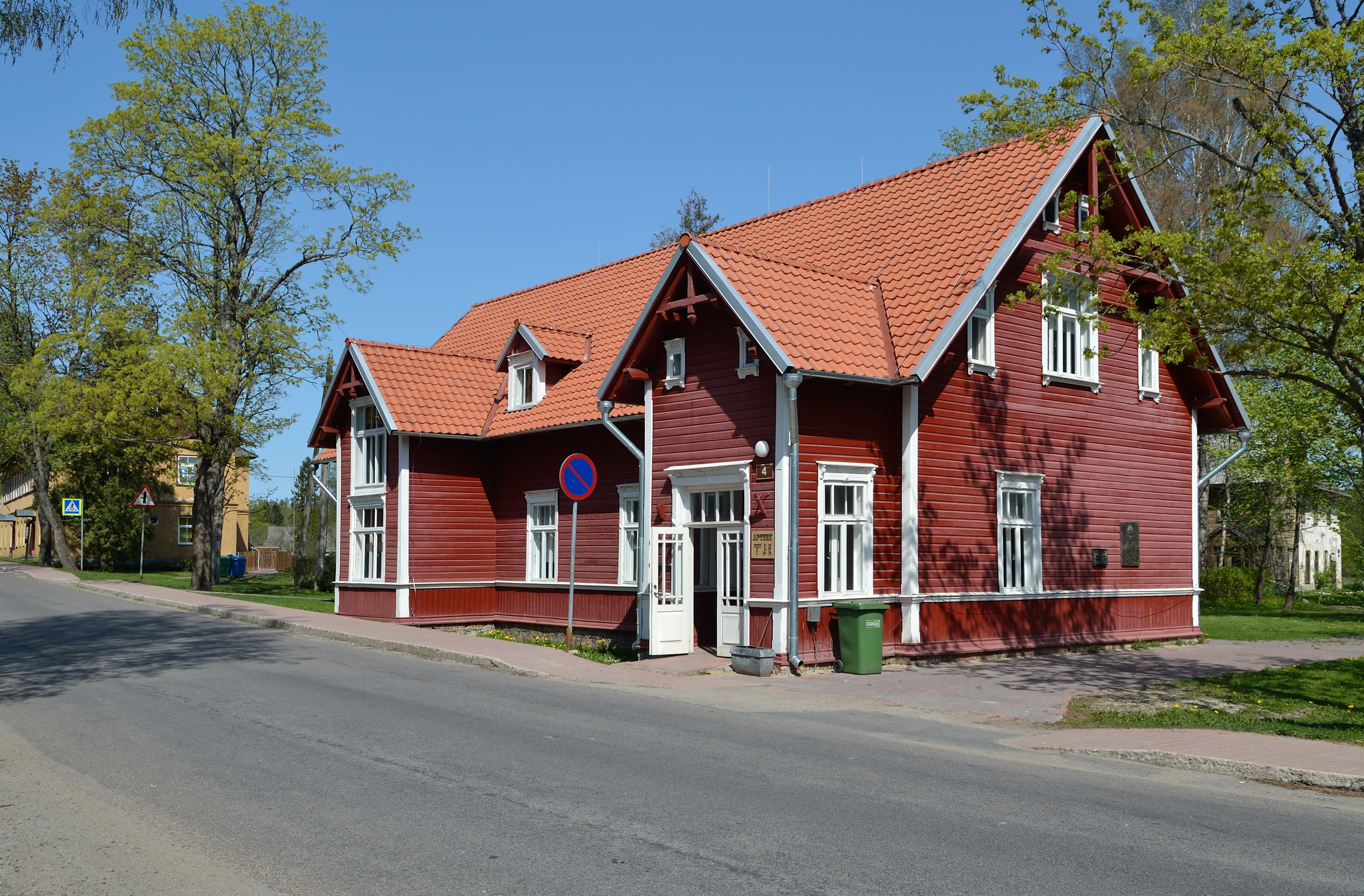
Palamuse pharmacy

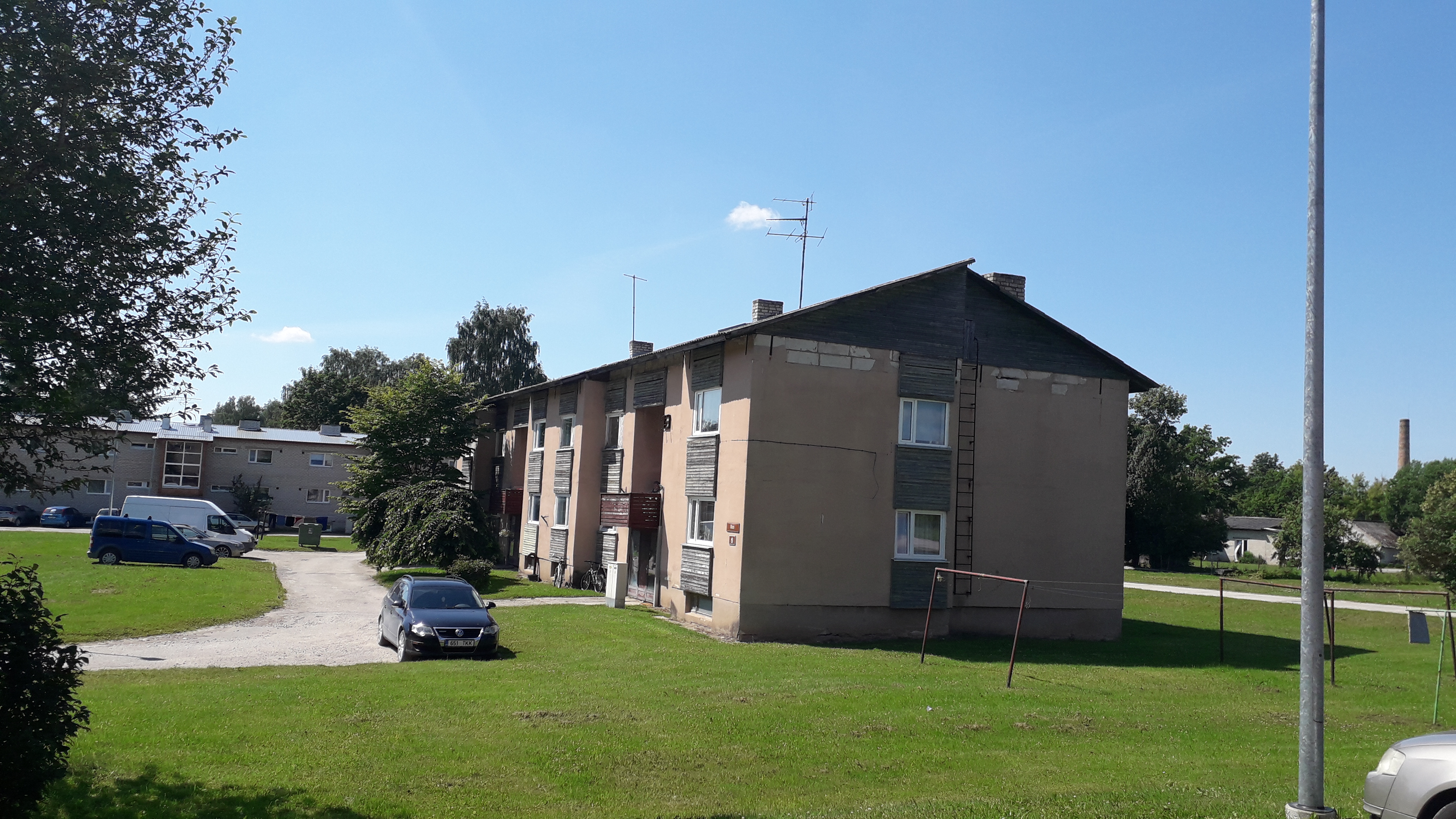
Palamuse, dwellings
