= Otslava =

Village in Estonia

- Village
- Location within Estonia
- Coordinates: 58.6117°N 26.6925°E
- Country: Estonia
- County: Tartu County
- Parish: Tartu Parish
- Time zone: UTC+2 (EET)
  - Summer (DST): UTC+3 (EEST)

Otslava is a village in Tartu Parish, Tartu County in Estonia.

On 4 July 2022, parts of the dissolved village of Vahi were merged into the villages of Otslava and Lilu.
