= Voldi =

Village in Estonia

- Village
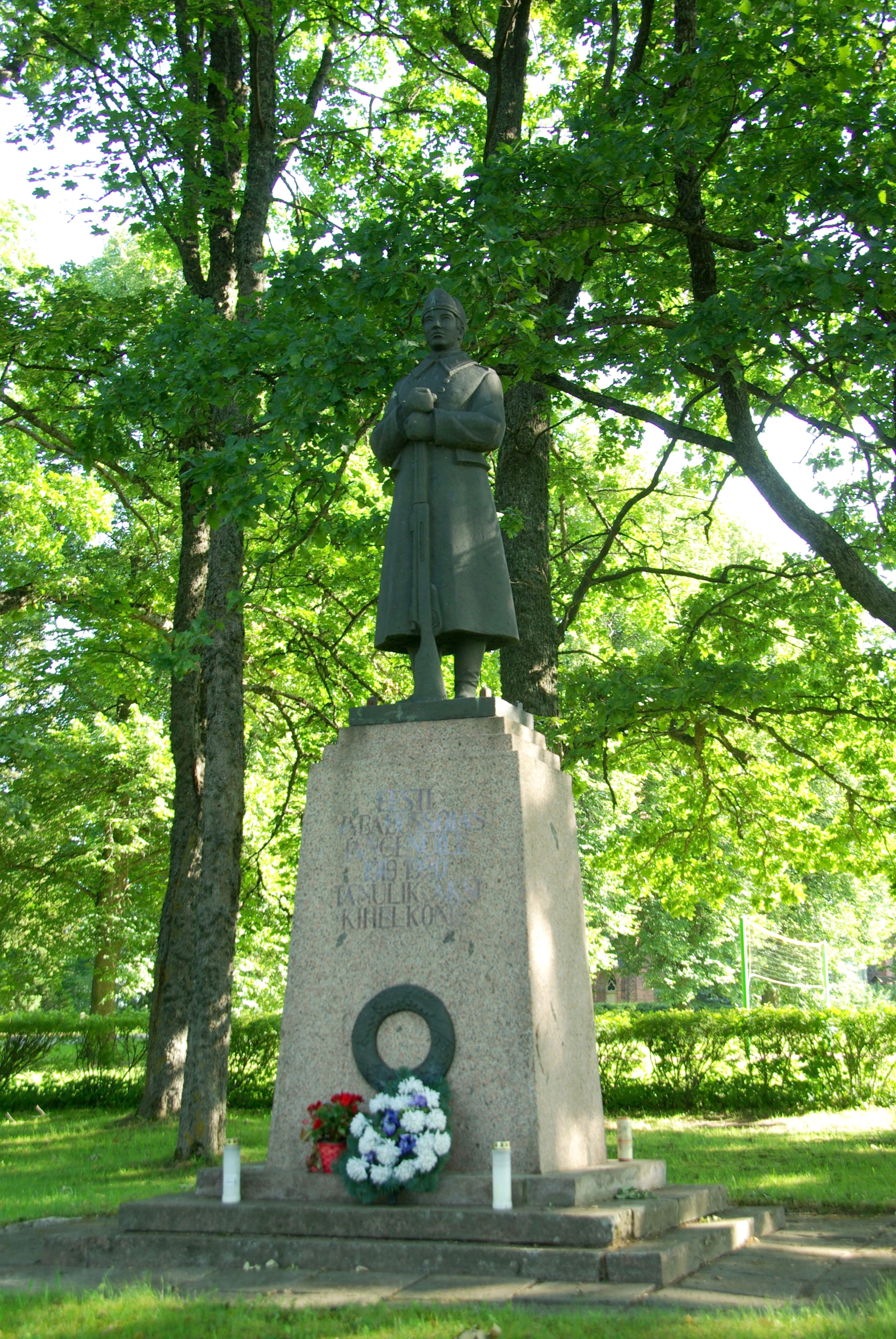
- Äksi War of Independence Monument, located in Voldi

- Location within Estonia
- Coordinates: 58.549722222222°N 26.578333333333°E
- Country: Estonia
- County: Tartu County
- Parish: Tartu Parish
- Time zone: UTC+2 (EET)
  - Summer (DST): UTC+3 (EEST)

Voldi is a village in Tartu Parish, Tartu County in Estonia.
