= Vooremaa =

Drumlin field in Estonia

Coordinates: 58°39′54″N 26°35′21″E

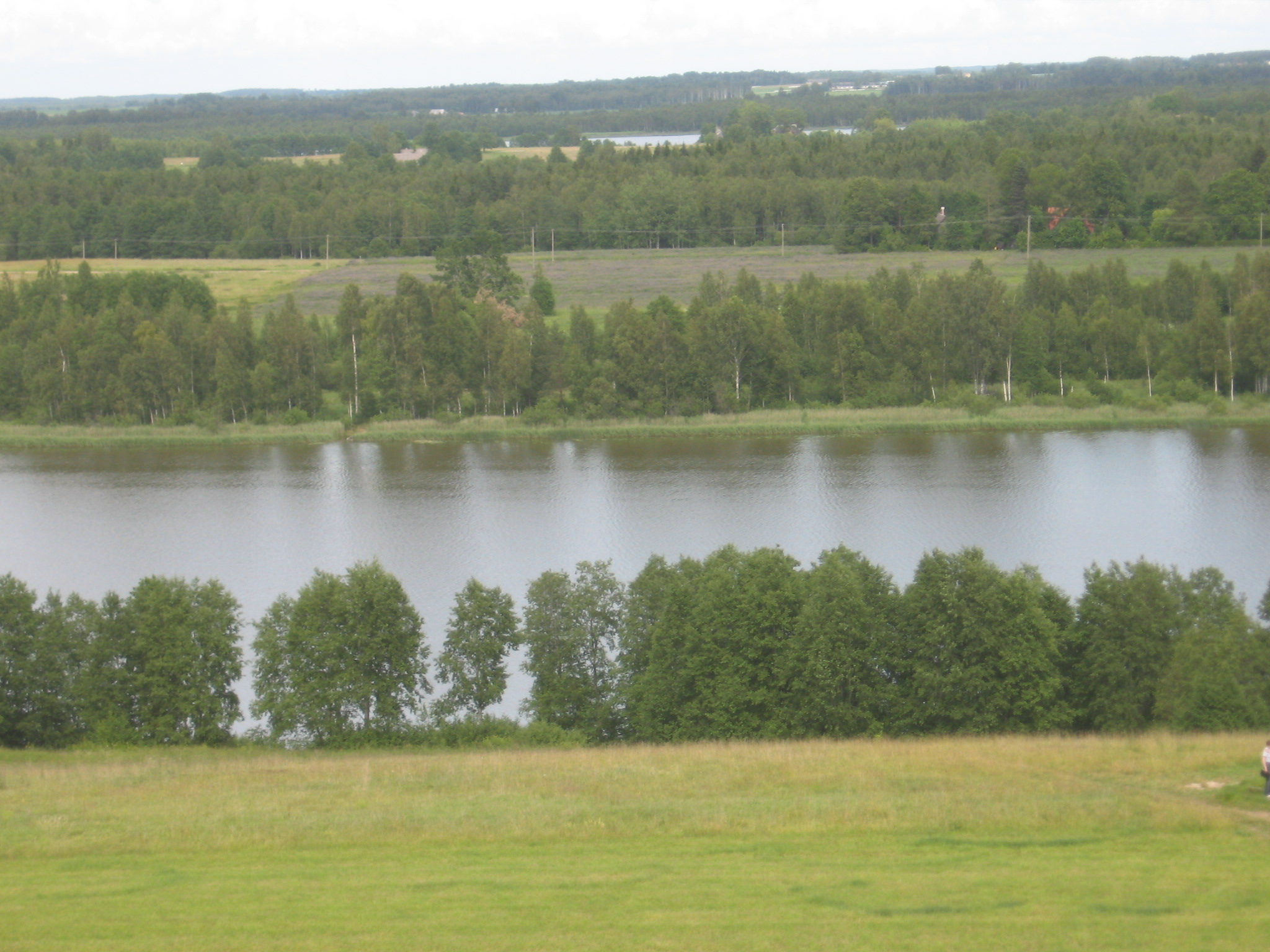
The drumlins and depressions alternating in Raigastvere.

Vooremaa (literally, 'Drumlin Land' in Estonian; also the Saadjärv Drumlin Field) is a 977 km^{2} (377 sq mi) landscape region mostly in Jõgeva County, Estonia. It consists of drumlins and depressions that were formed by glacial accumulation and erosion. All the landscape elements such as relief, vegetation, waterbodies, and watercourses as well as settlements follow the northwest–southeast direction of the drumlins. The drumlins are 2–13 km (1.2–8.1 mi) long, 1–2 km (0.62–1.24 mi) wide, and up to 70 m (230 ft) high. 47% of Vooremaa is cultivated and villages are located on the feet of the drumlins. One-fifth (20.3%) of the area is covered by wetlands. The highest point is Laiuse Drumlin, at 144 m (472 ft).
