= Lilu, Estonia =

Village in Estonia

Lilu
- Village
- Location in Estonia
- Coordinates: 58°34′28″N 26°44′16″E
- Country: Estonia
- County: Tartu County
- Municipality: Tartu Parish

Population (01.01.2009)
  - Total: 37

Lilu is a village in Tartu Parish, Tartu County, Estonia. It has a population of 37 (as of 1 January 2009).

On 4 July 2022, parts of the dissolved village of Vahi were merged into the villages of Lilu and Otslava.
