= Raigastvere =

Village in Estonia

Coordinates: 58°35′N 26°38′E

- Village
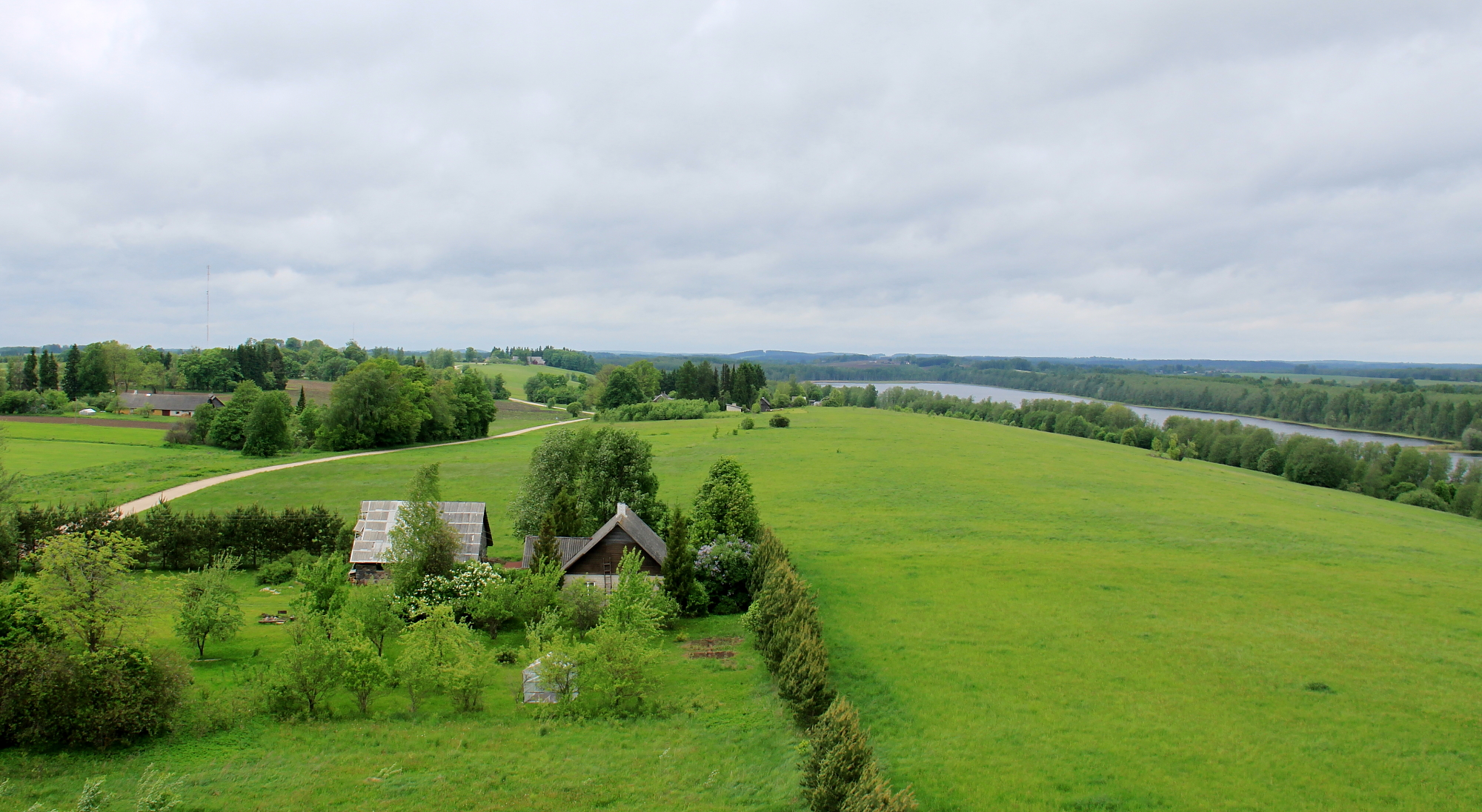
- Raigastvere and Lake Raigastvere
- Interactive map of Raigastvere
- Country: Estonia
- County: Tartu County
- Parish: Tartu Parish
- Time zone: UTC+2 (EET)
  - Summer (DST): UTC+3 (EEST)

Raigastvere is a village in Tartu Parish, Tartu County in eastern Estonia. Lake Raigastvere is located near the village.
