= Kaiavere, Tartu County =

Village in Estonia

Kaiavere
- Village
- Location in Estonia
- Coordinates: 58°35′22″N 26°41′22″E
- Country: Estonia
- County: Tartu County
- Municipality: Tartu Parish

Population (01.01.2009)
  - Total: 54

Kaiavere is a village in Tartu Parish, Tartu County, Estonia. It has a population of 54 (as of 1 January 2009).
