= Lohkva =

Village in Estonia

- Location within Estonia
- Coordinates: 58°22′9″N 26°47′53″E
- Country: Estonia
- County: Tartu County
- Time zone: UTC+2 (EET)

Lohkva is a settlement in Luunja Parish, Tartu County in eastern Estonia.

Poet Karl Eduard Sööt (1862–1950) was born in Lohkva.

== Gallery ==
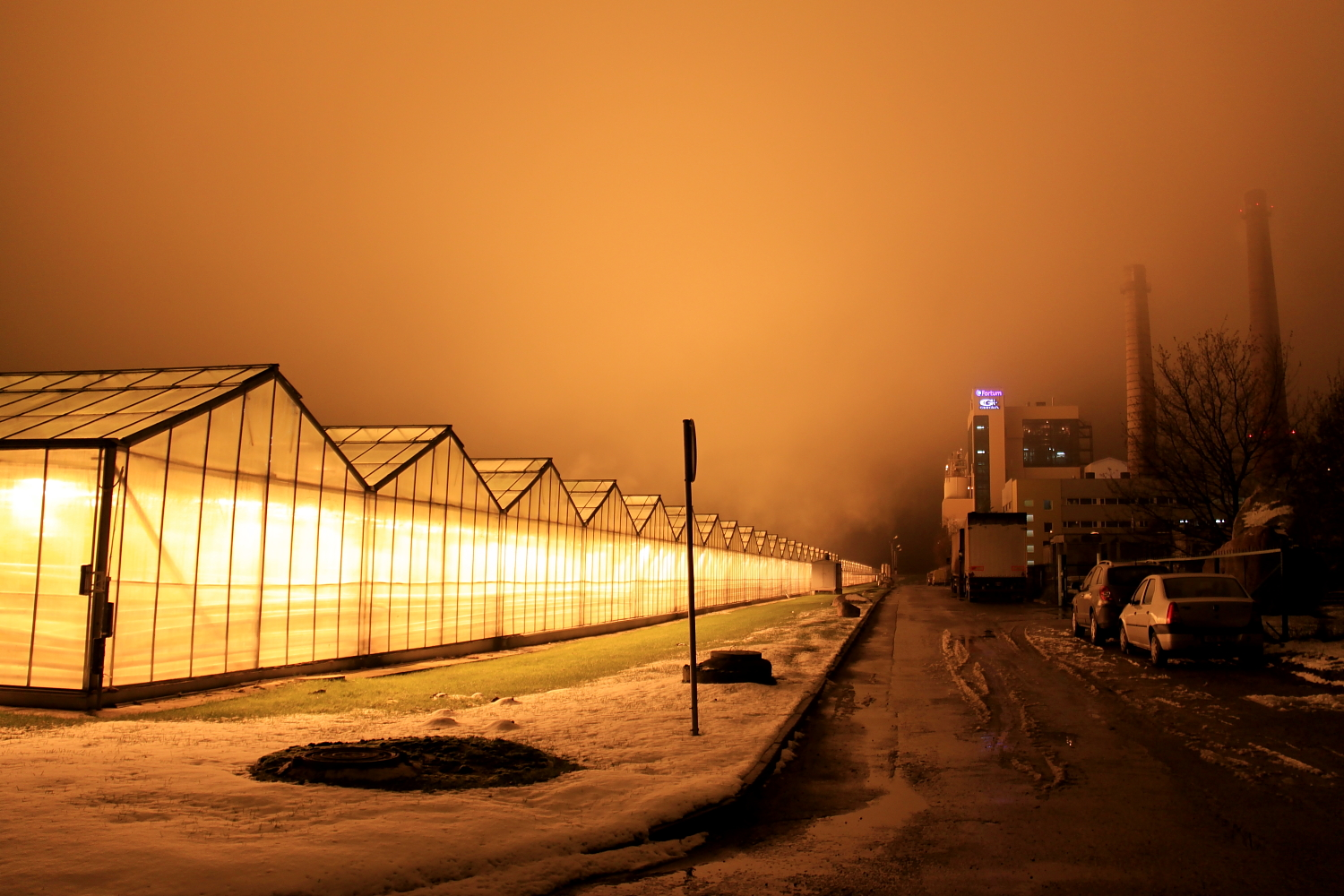
The Luunja cucumber greenhouses in Lohkva.

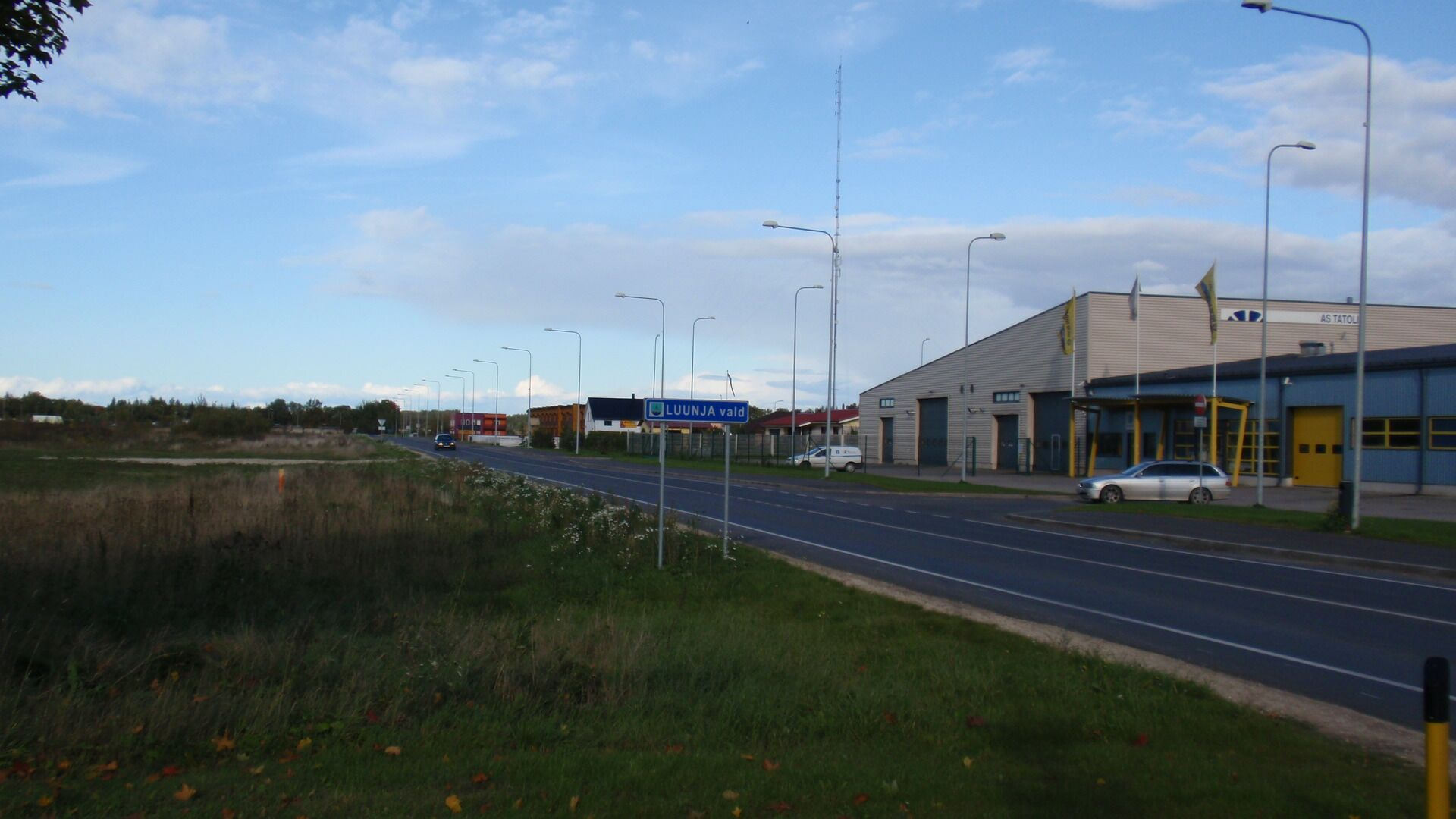
Beginning of Rõõmu–Viira road (nr 22253) just outside Tartu in Lohkva.
