= Kavastu =

Kavastu may refer to several places in Estonia:

- Kavastu, Lääne-Viru County, village in Haljala Parish, Lääne-Viru County
- Kavastu, Tartu County, village in Luunja Parish, Tartu County
