= Luunja Parish =

Municipality of Estonia

Coordinates: 58°21′N 26°53′E

Luunja Parish Luunja vald
- Municipality of Estonia
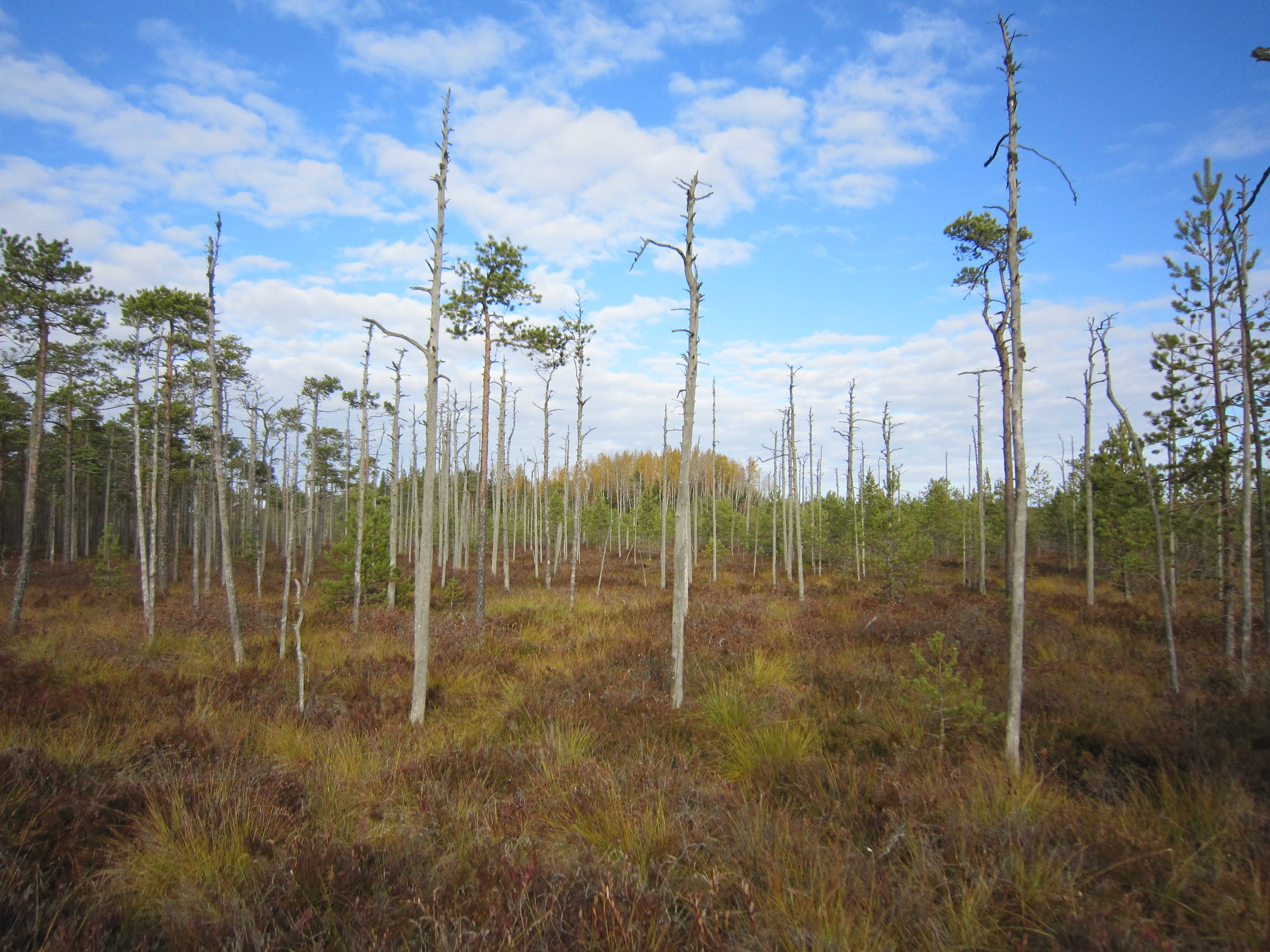
- Pähklisaare Nature Park

- Flag Coat of arms

- Luunja Parish within Tartu County.
- Country: Estonia
- County: Tartu County
- Administrative centre: Luunja
- ISO 3166 code: EE-432
- Website: www.luunja.ee

Luunja Parish is a rural municipality in Tartu County, Estonia.

== Settlements ==
Small borough

Luunja

Villages

Kabina - Kakumetsa - Kavastu - Kikaste - Kõivu - Lohkva - Muri - Pajukurmu - Pilka - Poksi - Põvvatu - Rõõmu - Sääsekõrva - Sääsküla - Sava - Savikoja - Sirgu - Sirgumetsa - Veibri - Viira

== Religion ==
Religion in Luunja Parish (2021)
1. Unaffiliated (81.0%)
2. Orthodox & Old Believers (9.30%)
3. Lutheran (6.70%)
4. Others Christians (0.70%)
5. Others Religions or Unknown (1.90%)
6. 0.00%

== Notable people ==
- Karl Eduard Sööt (1862 in Lohkva – 1950), poet,
- Ernst Hiis (1872 in Luunja Parish – 1964), piano maker, founder of the Estonia Piano Factory
- Eduard Sõrmus (1878 in Kõivu – 1940), violinist
- Jaan Jaago (1887 in Luunja Parish –1949), wrestler
- Nikolai Köstner (1889 in Luunja Parish – 1959), politician, economist, diplomat and academic

== Gallery ==
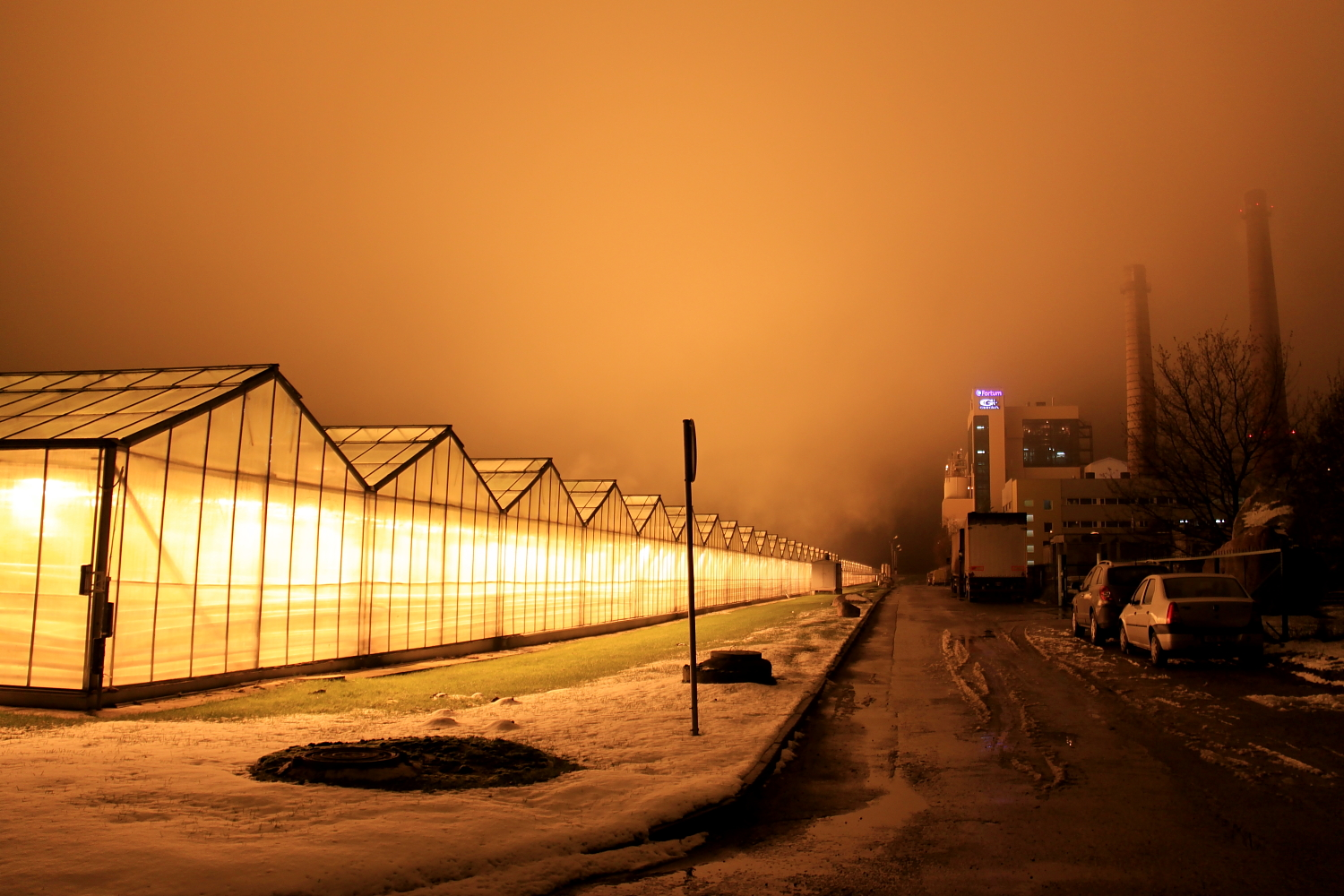
The Luunja cucumber greenhouses in Lohkva.

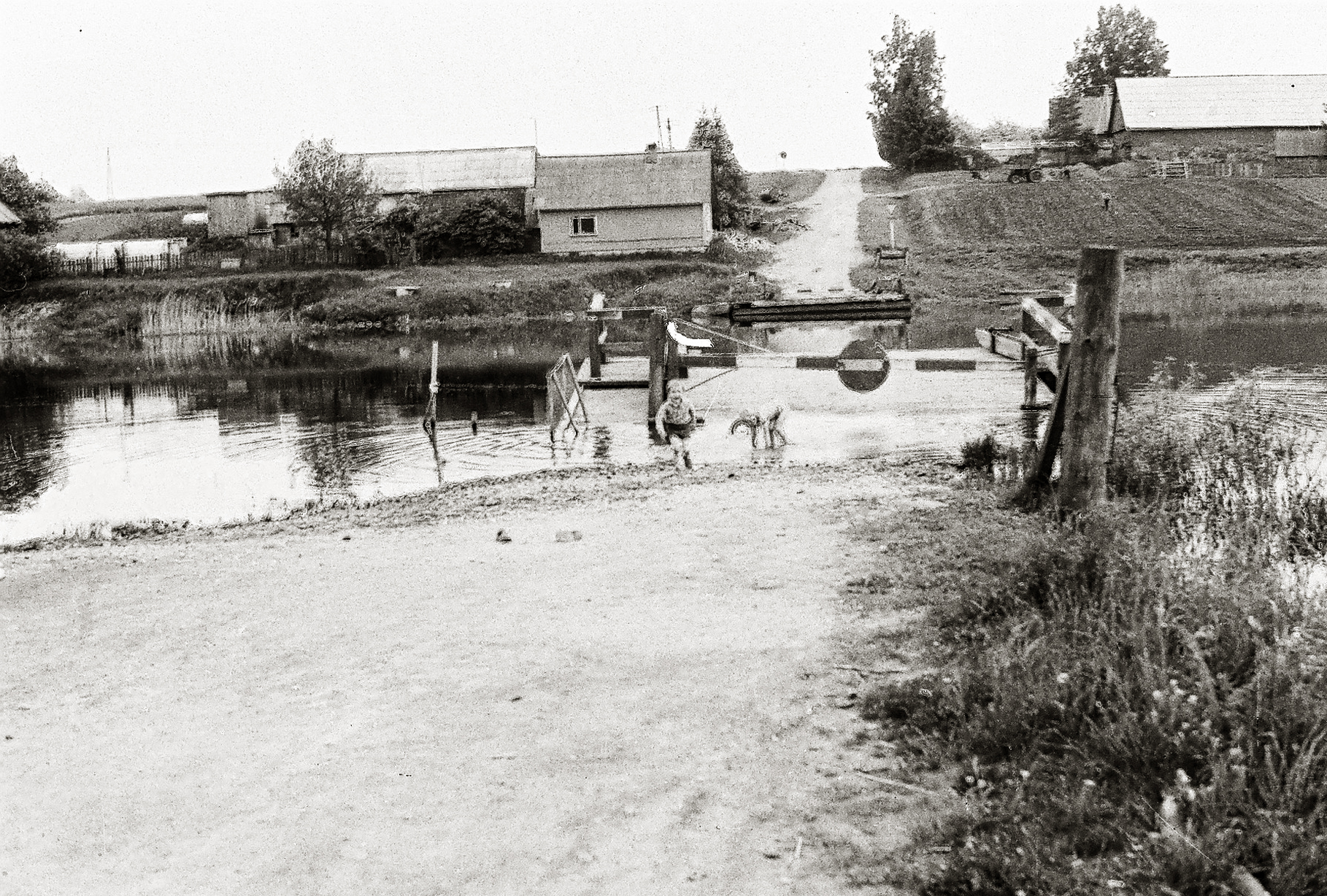
Raft over Emajõgi in Kavastu, 1984.

== Twinnings ==
- Jämsänkoski, Finland

== See also ==
- JK Luunja
