= Jaago =

Jaago may refer to:

- Jaago (1985 film)
- Jaago (2004 film), a Bollywood crime drama film
- Jaago (2010 film), a Bangladeshi sports drama film
- JAAGO Foundation, a Bangladesh-based civil society organization
- Adeele Jaago (born 1989), Estonian actress
- Jaan Jaago (1887–1949), Estonian wrestler
