= Raadi Nature Reserve =

Protected area in Estonia

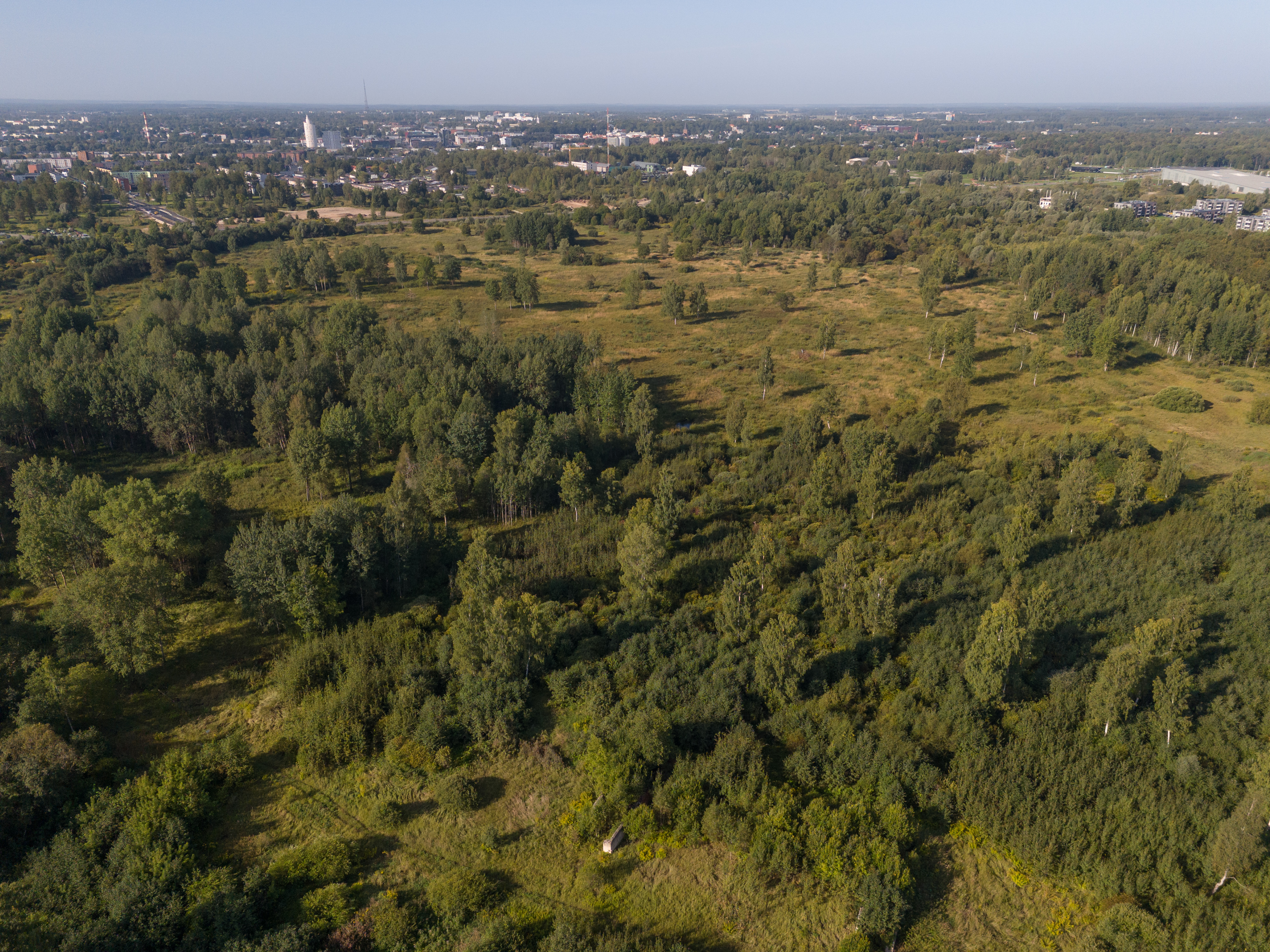

- Location within Estonia
- Location: Estonia
- Coordinates: 58°23′30″N 26°46′10″E
- Area: 87 ha (210 acres)
- Established: 2015

Raadi Nature Reserve is a nature reserve which is located in Tartu County, Estonia.

The area of the nature reserve is 87 ha.

The protected area was founded in 2015 to protect valuable habitat types and threatened species in Tila village (Tartu Parish), in Rõõmu village (former Luunja Parish) and in Tartu City.
