= Keeri-Karijärve Nature Reserve =

Protected area in Estonia

Keeri-Karijärve
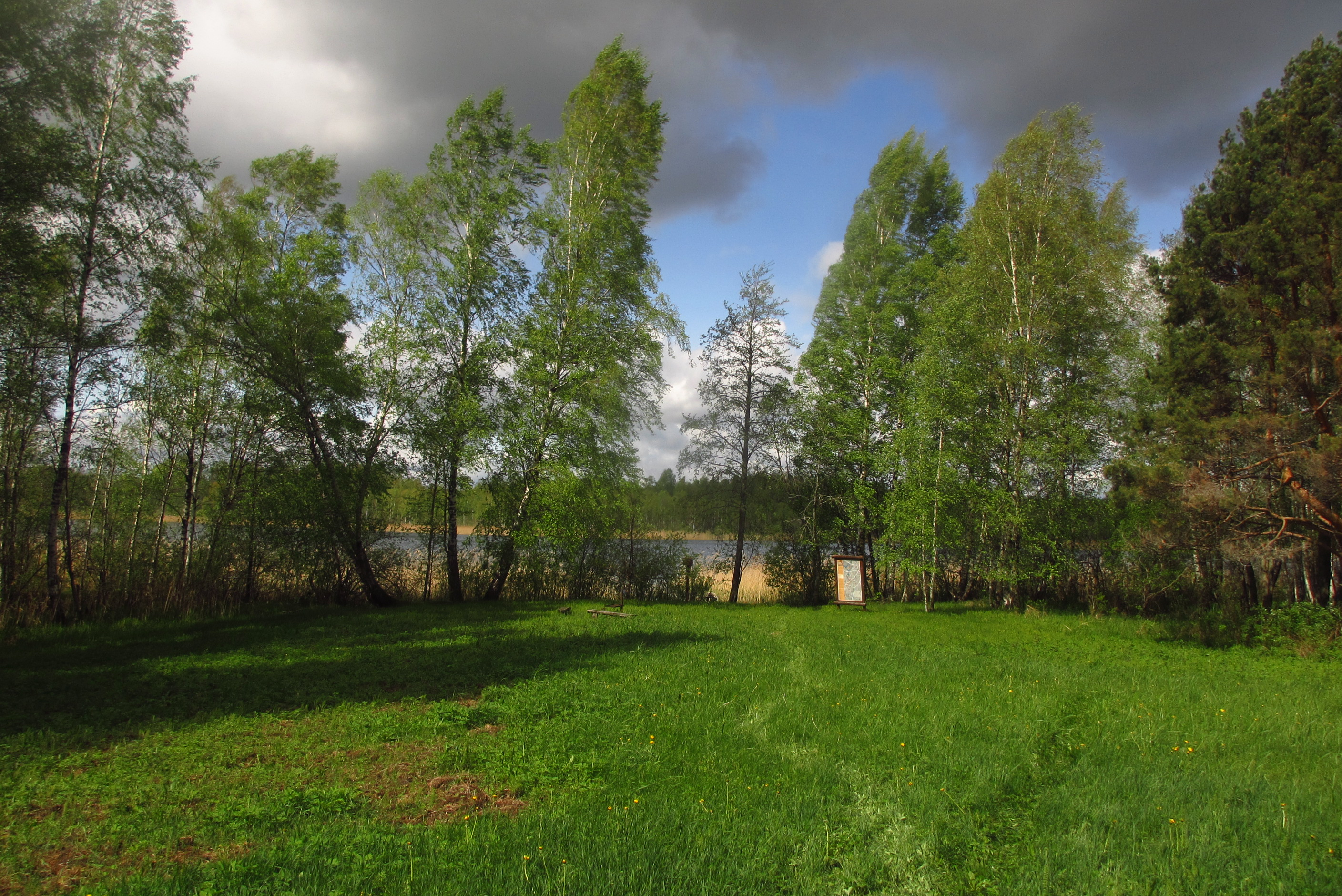

- Location within Estonia
- Location: Estonia
- Nearest city: Tartu
- Coordinates: 58°18′36″N 26°25′51″E
- Area: 1,910 ha (4,700 acres)

Keeri-Karijärve Nature Reserve is a nature reserve situated in south-eastern Estonia, in Tartu County.

Keeri-Karijärve Nature Reserve serves to protect an area of unusual flooded meadows around Elva River and a number of lakes. It also includes areas of old-growth forest. This environment is an important habitat for a number of protected bird species, including four species of eagle; most notably, the greater spotted eagle. The waters of the nature reserve also contain a number of protected species of fish, e.g. asp, loach and European weatherfish.

For visitors, a hiking trail and an overnight shelter has been prepared. Arrangements have also been made that allow visitors to explore the area by boat.
