= Sääsekõrva =

Village in Estonia

- Village
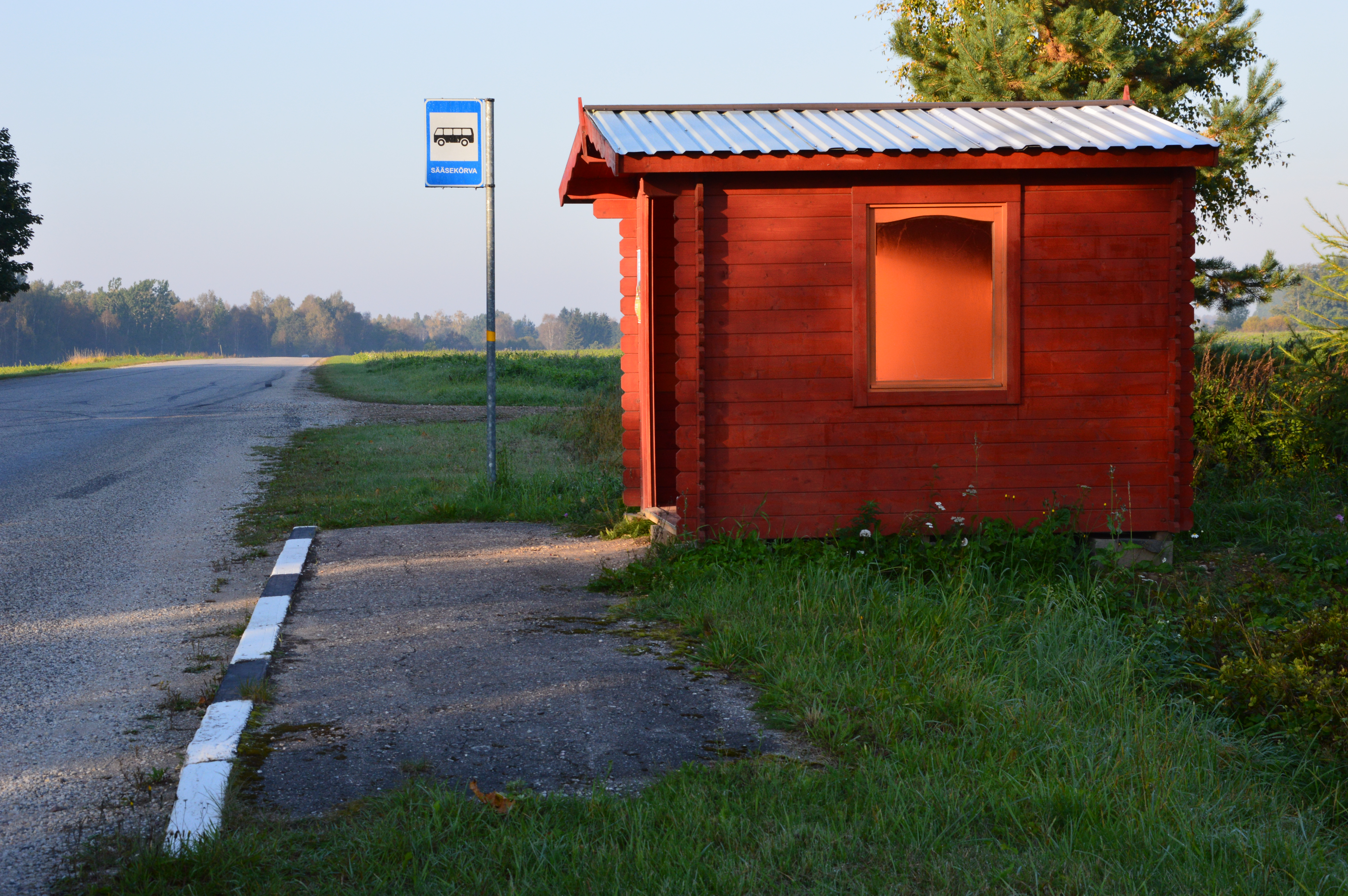
- Sääsekõrva bus stop

- Location within Estonia
- Coordinates: 58°23′N 26°56′E
- Country: Estonia
- County: Tartu County
- Parish: Luunja Parish
- Time zone: UTC+2 (EET)
  - Summer (DST): UTC+3 (EEST)

Sääsekõrva is a small village located in Viljandi Parish, Viljandi County, in southern Estonia.
