= Kikaste =

Village in Estonia

Coordinates: 58°23′N 27°00′E

- Village
- Interactive map of Kikaste
- Country: Estonia
- County: Tartu County
- Parish: Luunja Parish
- Time zone: UTC+2 (EET)
  - Summer (DST): UTC+3 (EEST)

Kikaste is a village in Luunja Parish, Tartu County in eastern Estonia.
