= Peipsiveere Nature Reserve =

Protected area in Estonia

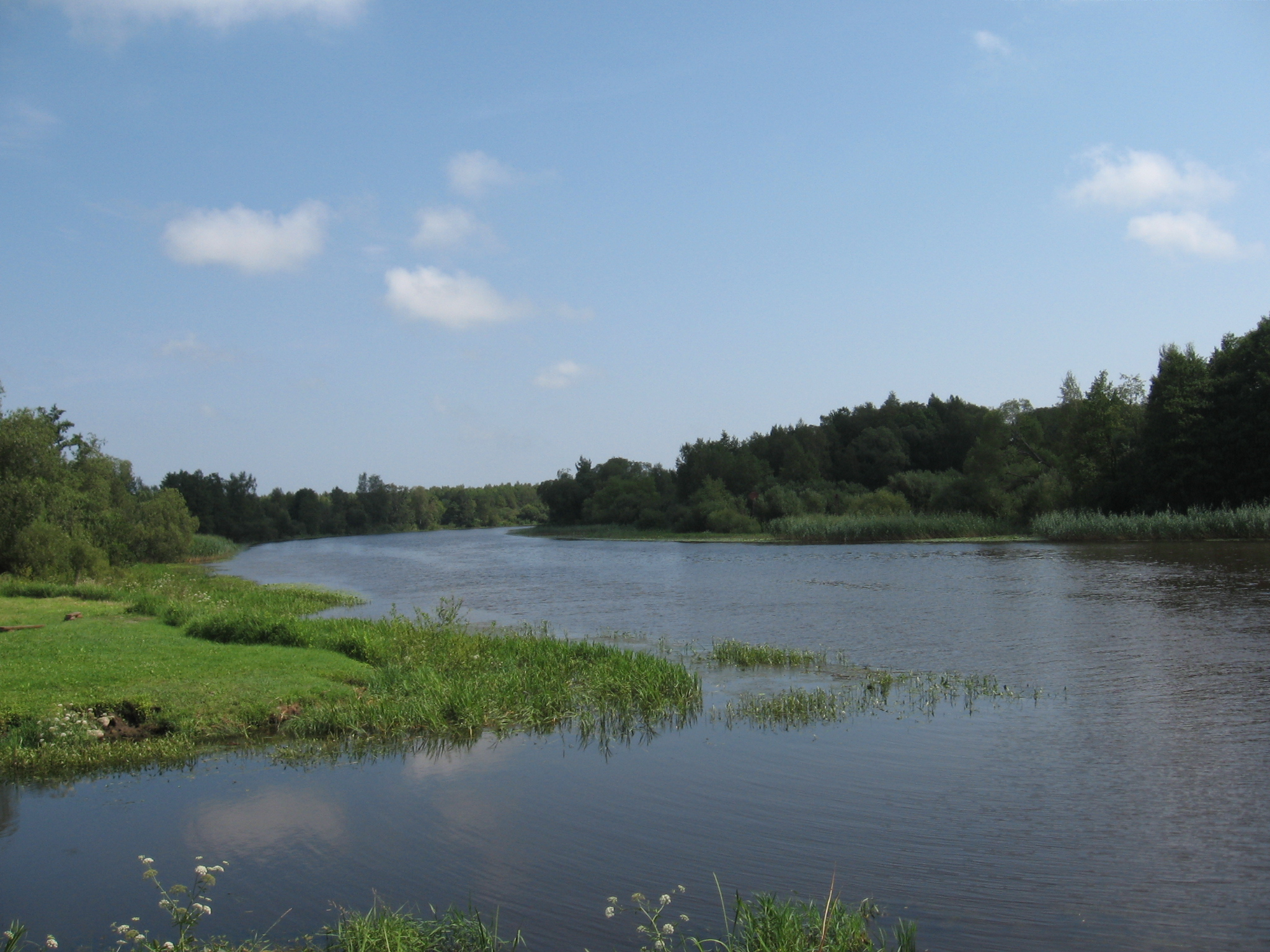
- Emajõgi in the Emajõe Suursoo

- Location within Estonia
- Location: Tartu County, Estonia
- Nearest city: Tartu
- Coordinates: 58°22′51″N 27°19′06″E
- Area: 346.1 km^{2} (133.6 mi^{2})
- Established: December 20, 2013

Ramsar Wetland
- Official name: Emajõe Suursoo Mire and Piirissaar Island
- Designated: June 5, 1997
- Reference no.: 906

Peipsiveere Nature Reserve (Estonian: Peipsiveere looduskaitseala) is a nature reserve in Tartu County, Estonia, located around the estuary of the Emajõgi River, on the southwestern coast of Lake Peipus.

Peipsiveere Nature Reserve was established by a decree of 20 December 2013 by combining Piirissaare, Emajõe and Emajõe-Suursoo protected areas.
