= Eduard Sõrmus =

Estonian violinist (1878–1940)

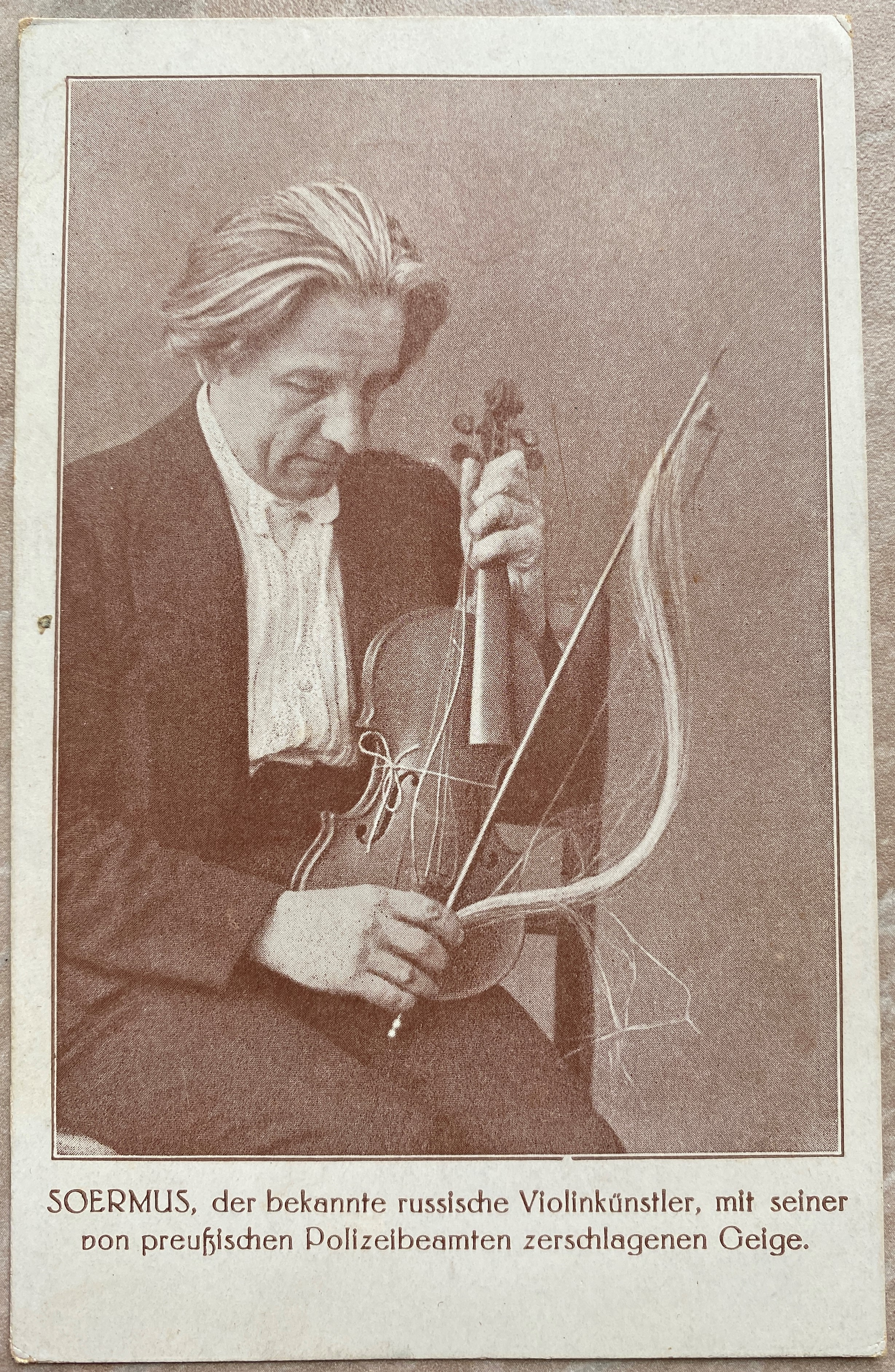
1923 Postcard – Sõrmus with a broken violin

Eduard Sõrmus (9 July 1878 – 16 August 1940) was an early 20th-century Estonian violinist. He was sometimes known as the Red Violinist (der rote Geiger).

== Biography ==
=== Childhood ===
Eduard Sõrmus was born in the village of Kõivu, Luunja Parish, Tartu County, in the Governorate of Livonia, the Russian Empire (present-day Estonia). He inherited part of his interest for music from his mother Leena, who had a lovely singing voice and who used to sing during her daily tasks. When Sõrmus was 6 years old, his father gave him his first violin. Sõrmus's first music teacher was a local tailor named Gustav Puks. Sõrmus went to Hugo Treffner Gymnasium in Tartu from 1888. In gymnasium, he continued playing violin with Johann Kelder, who was a medical student in the University of Tartu.

=== Early career ===
Sõrmus then gave his first concerts in his farmstead and in a neighbouring house. In 1899, Sõrmus went to university and started studying law at the university. After a year in the faculty of law, he changed his studies over to history and languages. In 1902, Sõrmus continued his violin studies at the Saint Petersburg Conservatory under the hand of violin master Leopold Auer. Sõrmus became active in the Russian Revolutionary movement and eventually took part in the 1905 Russian Revolution. Many music critics have noted Edouard's violin virtuosity: Sermus studied with Henri Marteau in Berlin in 1910 and with Lucien Capet in Paris in 1913.

=== Red Violinist (der rote Geiger) ===
In 1904, he began touring, giving violin recitals and giving ardent speeches of proletarian sufferings and miseries. That was enough to be listed in the police's list of most wanted. In 1906, because of his revolutionary activity, he was forced to flee Russia, so he toured Europe giving recitals. Sõrmus spent World War I in Paris and London, after which he returned to Russia for a couple of years and then toured the continent again. During many concerts across Europe his wife, Virginia, played the pianoforte. Sõrmus was a labour activist. He gave a number of charity concerts, the proceeds of which went to help the poor, and concerts to children. Near Dresden, there is a children's orphanage which was built with donation money collected during Sõrmus's concerts. In the 1920s, he was mainly active in Germany. There are several streets named after him: Soermus-Straße in the city of Zwickau, Schumann's birthplace, and Eduard-Soermus-Straße in the city of Radebeul.

The 1912 Marc Chagall painting Der Geiger was inspired by Sõrmus.

=== Late career and health decline ===
Sõrmus' performances met not only an enthusiastic reception, but also confrontation from bourgeois circles – on 1 May 1923, after the concert, the Magdeburg police broke Sermus' violin (this episode was reflected in the popular culture of that time – a photograph of the famous virtuoso with a broken violin was placed on a postcard). After that, in gratitude, he was presented with a violin by Giovanni Paolo Maggini of 1633. Sermus' performance was greeted with enthusiastic reception from the audience, including at such prestigious concert venues as Leipzig's St.Thomas Church. His last concerts were in the UK in early 1937. After that due to the health decline Sõrmus returned to Soviet Russia – Leningrad, and later – to Moscow.

He died at the Botkin Hospital in Moscow in August 1940 aged 62, whilst his wife, Virginia, was visiting her family in Britain.

=== Family ===
- The first wife: Ida Samoilovna Sõrmus-Põder; 1887–1959; in 1916 she became the third wife of Viktor Chernov — one of the founders of the Russian Socialist-Revolutionary Party, Minister for Agriculture in the Russian Provisional Government, Chairman of the Russian Constituent Assembly.
- The second wife: Francis Sõrmus (Hewlett)
- The third wife: Virginia Sõrmus, UK pianist
- Daughter: Pauline Soermus, UK
- Brother: Jaan Sõrmus 26 February 1872 (Lunia) — 21 January 1920 (Tartumaa)
- Sister: Juliane Pouline Liiv 1 June 1875 — 22 December 1900 (Tartumaa)

== Memory ==
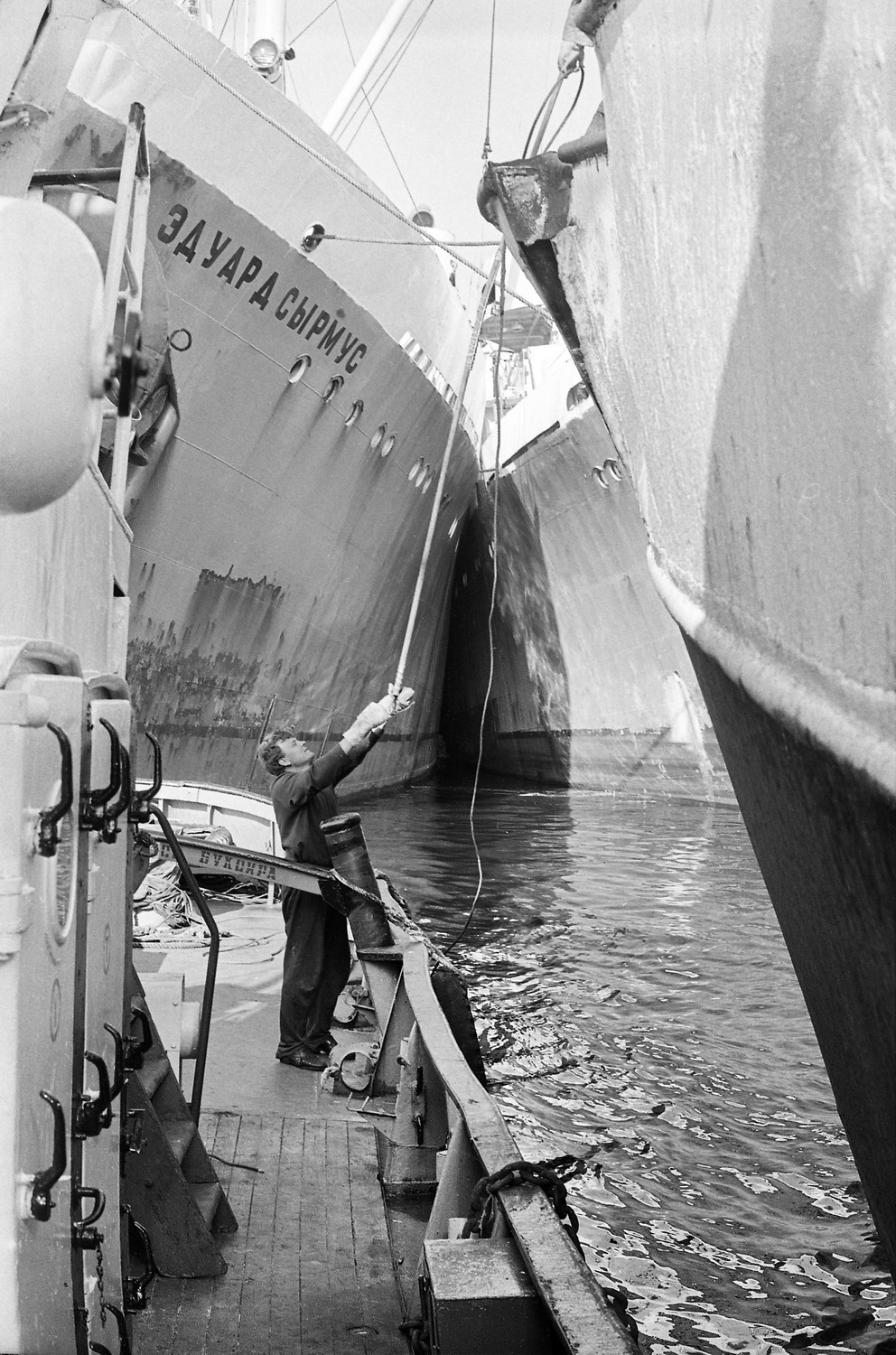
Large freezing fishing trawler Eduard Sõrmus, 1976

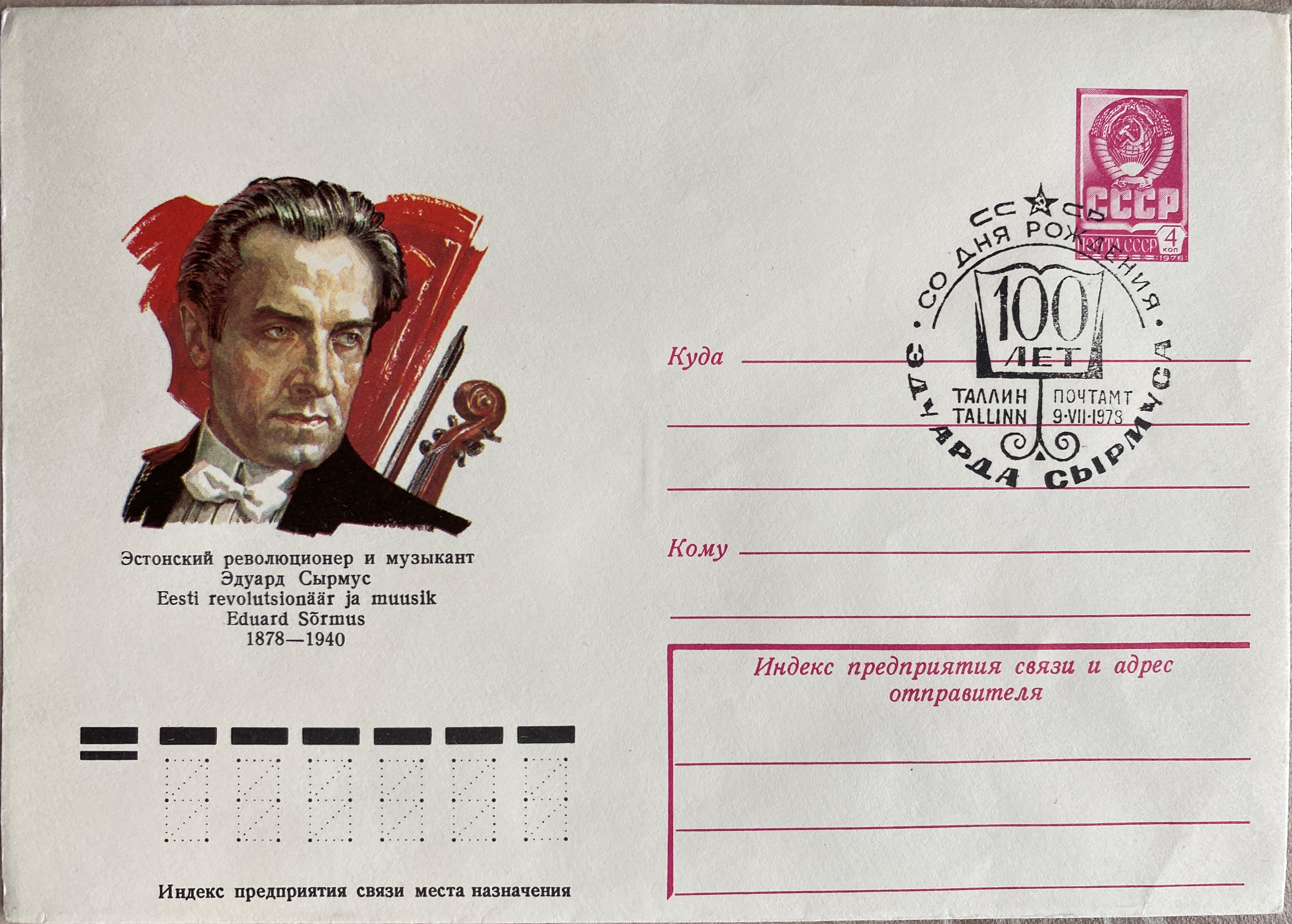
Sõrmus auf einer sowjetischen Postkarte, 1978

- 1958: Giovanni Maggini's 1633 Sõrmus violin is donated by the widow Virginia to the Estonian Theater and Music Museum.
- 1966: Large freezing fishing trawler No. 441 "Eduard Sõrmus" was built at the shipyard in Nikolaev. Since 1968, the port of registry has been Tallinn.
- 1968: A book about Eduard Sõrmus by Estonian musicologist Harri Kõrvits was published
- 1975: The film "Red Violin" (East Germany-Russia), Victor Lorenz starring as Eduard Sõrmus
- 1978: Post Office of the USSR – envelope "Estonian revolutionary and musician Eduard Sõrmus 1878–1940", artist Pyotr Bendel; special cancellation dated 9 July 1978 “100 years since the birth. USSR Tallinn – Post Office. No. 12780 in the CFA catalog.

== Sources ==
- Harri Kõrvits, Eduard Soermus – Der Rote Geiger. Translated from the Russian by Christof Rüger. Leipzig: VEB Deutscher Verlag für Musik, 1978.
