= Karl Eduard Sööt =

Estonian poet (1862–1950)

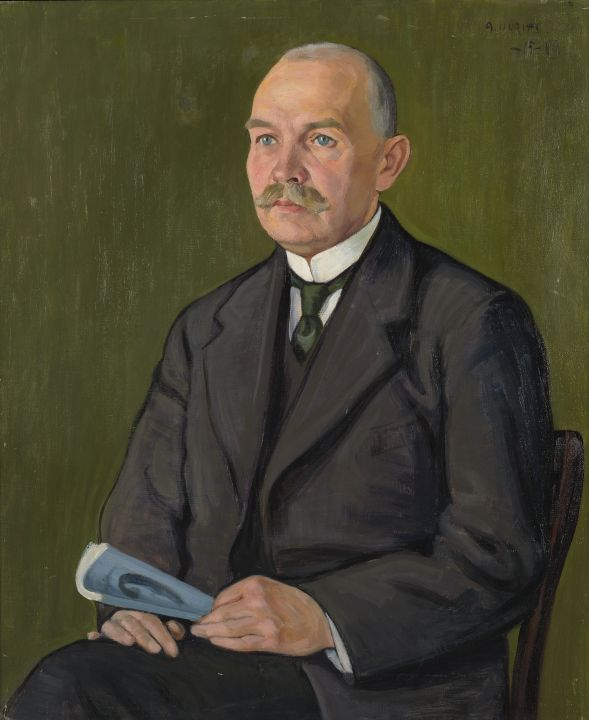
Portrait of Karl Eduard Sööt by Aleksander Uurits, 1915

Karl Eduard Sööt (26 December 1862, in Lohkva, Tartu County – 1 September 1950, in Tartu) was an Estonian poet.

Between 1886 and 1893 he worked for the newspaper Olevik.

In 1895 he founded his own publishing house, printing shop and bookshop. In 1914, Sööt sold his business. From 1921 until 1923 he was the editor-in-chief of the newspaper Postimees.

From 1886 until 1932 he was a member of Vanemuine Society.

He died in 1950 and is buried at Raadi Cemetery.

== Selected works ==
- 1894: poetry collection "Rõõm ja mure" ('Joy and Distress')
- 1899: poetry collection "Saatus" ('Fate')
- 1903: poetry collection "Mälestused ja lootused" ('Memories and Hopes')
