= Veibri =

Village in Estonia

Coordinates: 58°20′N 26°47′E

- Village
- Interactive map of Veibri
- Country: Estonia
- County: Tartu County
- Parish: Luunja Parish

Area
  - Total: 2.3 km^{2} (0.89 sq mi)

Population (01.01.2020)
  - Total: 984
- Time zone: UTC+2 (EET)
  - Summer (DST): UTC+3 (EEST)

Veibri is a village in Luunja Parish, Tartu County in eastern Estonia.
