= Sava, Estonia =

Village in Estonia

Coordinates: 58°23′N 26°57′E

Sava
- Village
- Interactive map of Sava
- Country: Estonia
- County: Tartu County
- Parish: Luunja Parish
- Time zone: UTC+2 (EET)
  - Summer (DST): UTC+3 (EEST)

Sava is a village in Luunja Parish, Tartu County in eastern Estonia.
