= Sääsküla, Tartu County =

Village in Estonia

Coordinates: 58°25′02″N 26°57′50″E

Sääsküla
- Village
- Interactive map of Sääsküla
- Country: Estonia
- County: Tartu County
- Parish: Luunja Parish
- Time zone: UTC+2 (EET)
  - Summer (DST): UTC+3 (EEST)

Sääsküla is a village in Luunja Parish, Tartu County in eastern Estonia.

Painter and art historian Eduard Ahas (1901–1944) was killed in Kangro farmstead in Sääsküla following the Tartu Offensive. A memorial plaque was opened in 1998.
