= Pilka, Estonia =

Village in Estonia

Coordinates: 58°25′N 26°54′E

Pilka
- Village
- Interactive map of Pilka
- Country: Estonia
- County: Tartu County
- Parish: Luunja Parish
- Time zone: UTC+2 (EET)
  - Summer (DST): UTC+3 (EEST)

Pilka is a village in Luunja Parish, Tartu County in eastern Estonia.
