= Muri, Tartu County =

Village in Estonia

Coordinates: 58°23′15″N 26°50′14″E

Muri
- Village
- Interactive map of Muri
- Country: Estonia
- County: Tartu County
- Parish: Luunja Parish
- Time zone: UTC+2 (EET)
  - Summer (DST): UTC+3 (EEST)

Muri is a village in Luunja Parish, Tartu County in eastern Estonia.
