= Kabina =

Village in Estonia

Coordinates: 58°22′N 26°51′E

- Village
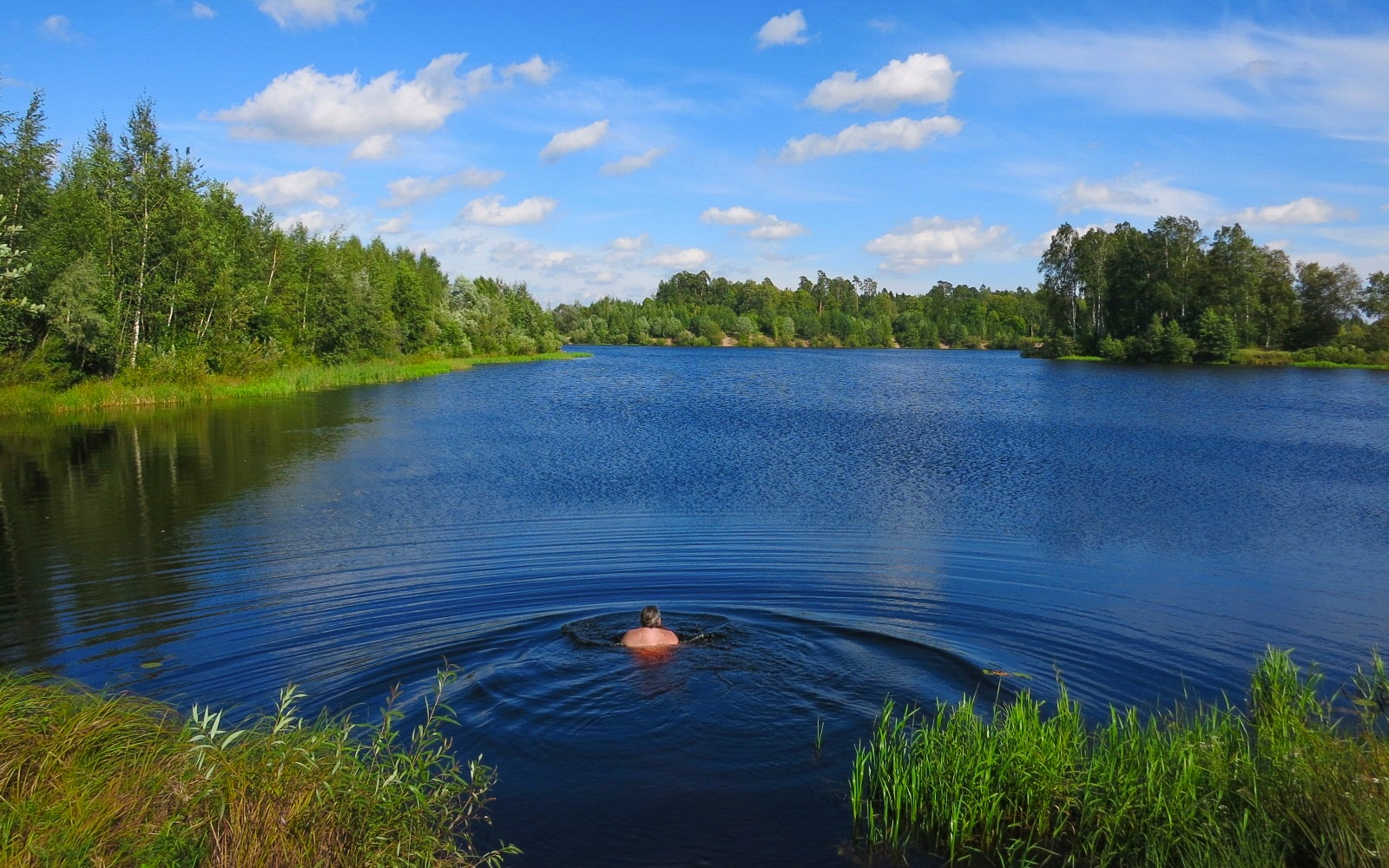
- Kabina quarry
- Interactive map of Kabina
- Country: Estonia
- County: Tartu County
- Parish: Luunja Parish
- Time zone: UTC+2 (EET)
  - Summer (DST): UTC+3 (EEST)

Kabina is a village in Luunja Parish, Tartu County in eastern Estonia.

The first Estonian Children Song Festival took place in Kabina on 2 June 1870.
