= Laeva (river) =

River in Estonia

Laeva River

Location
- Country: Estonia

Physical characteristics
- Mouth: Emajõgi
  - coordinates: 58°25′48″N 26°30′30″E
- Length: 53.5 km
- Basin size: 275.2 km²

The Laeva River is a river in Tartu and Jõgeva counties, Estonia. The river is 53.5 km long, and its basin size is 275.2 km^{2}. It discharges into the Emajõgi.
