= Viira, Tartu County =

Village in Estonia

Coordinates: 58°24′50″N 27°03′33″E

Viira
- Village
- Interactive map of Viira
- Country: Estonia
- County: Tartu County
- Parish: Luunja Parish
- Time zone: UTC+2 (EET)
  - Summer (DST): UTC+3 (EEST)

Viira is a village in Luunja Parish, Tartu County in eastern Estonia.
