= Elva (river) =

River in Estonia

Elva jõgi
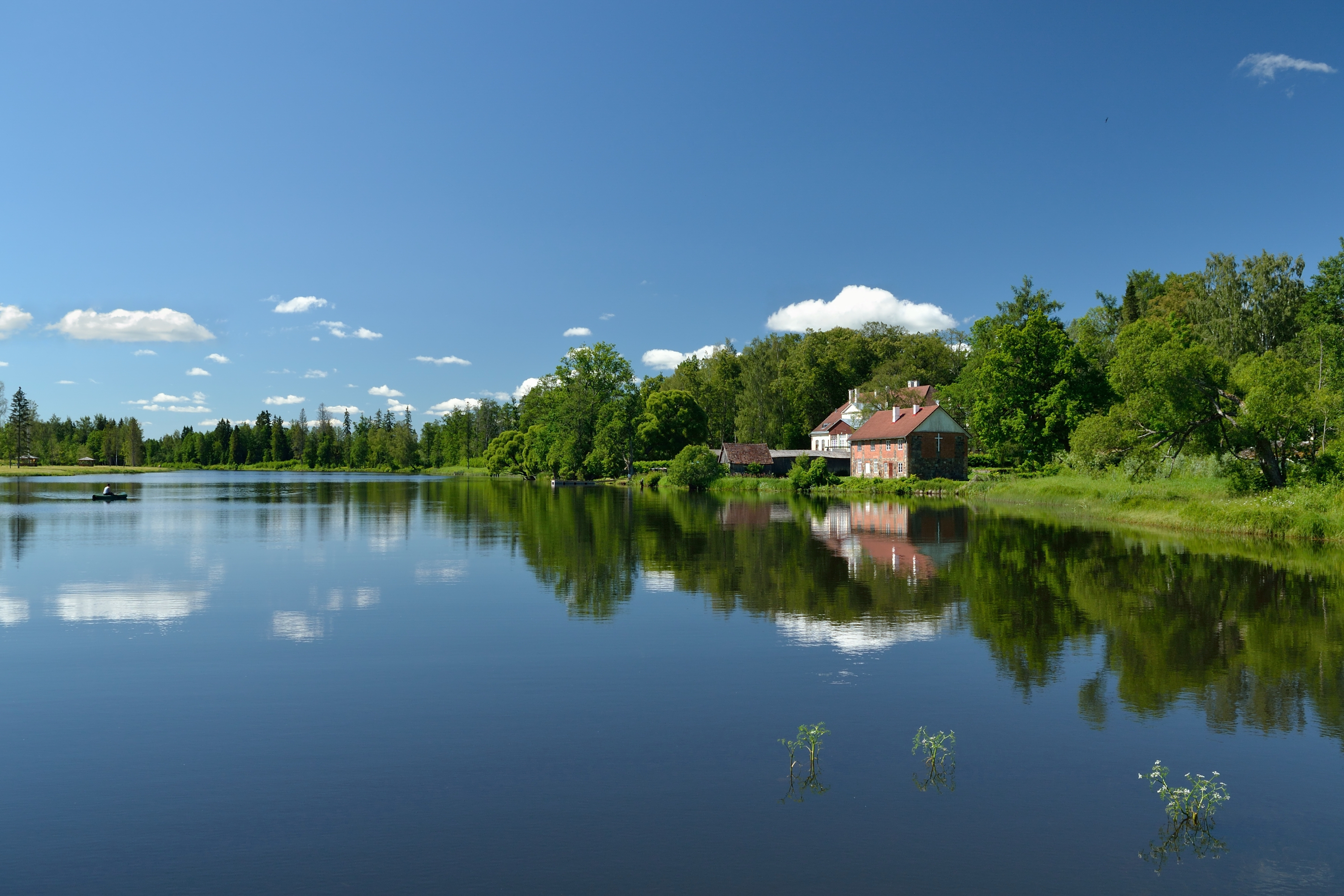
- Elva jõgi

Location
- Country: Estonia

Physical characteristics
- Mouth: Emajõgi
- Length: 82.4 km
- Basin size: 451.4 km²

Basin features
- Progression: Emajõgi→ Lake Peipus→ Narva→ Gulf of Finland

The Elva is river in Estonia in Põlva, Tartu, and Valga counties. The river is 82.4 km long and its basin size is 451.4 km^{2}. It runs from Valgjärv into Emajõgi.

There live also trout and grayling.

== See also ==
- List of rivers of Estonia
