= Kavastu, Lääne-Viru County =

Village in Estonia

Coordinates: 59°28′20″N 26°08′39″E

Kavastu
- Village
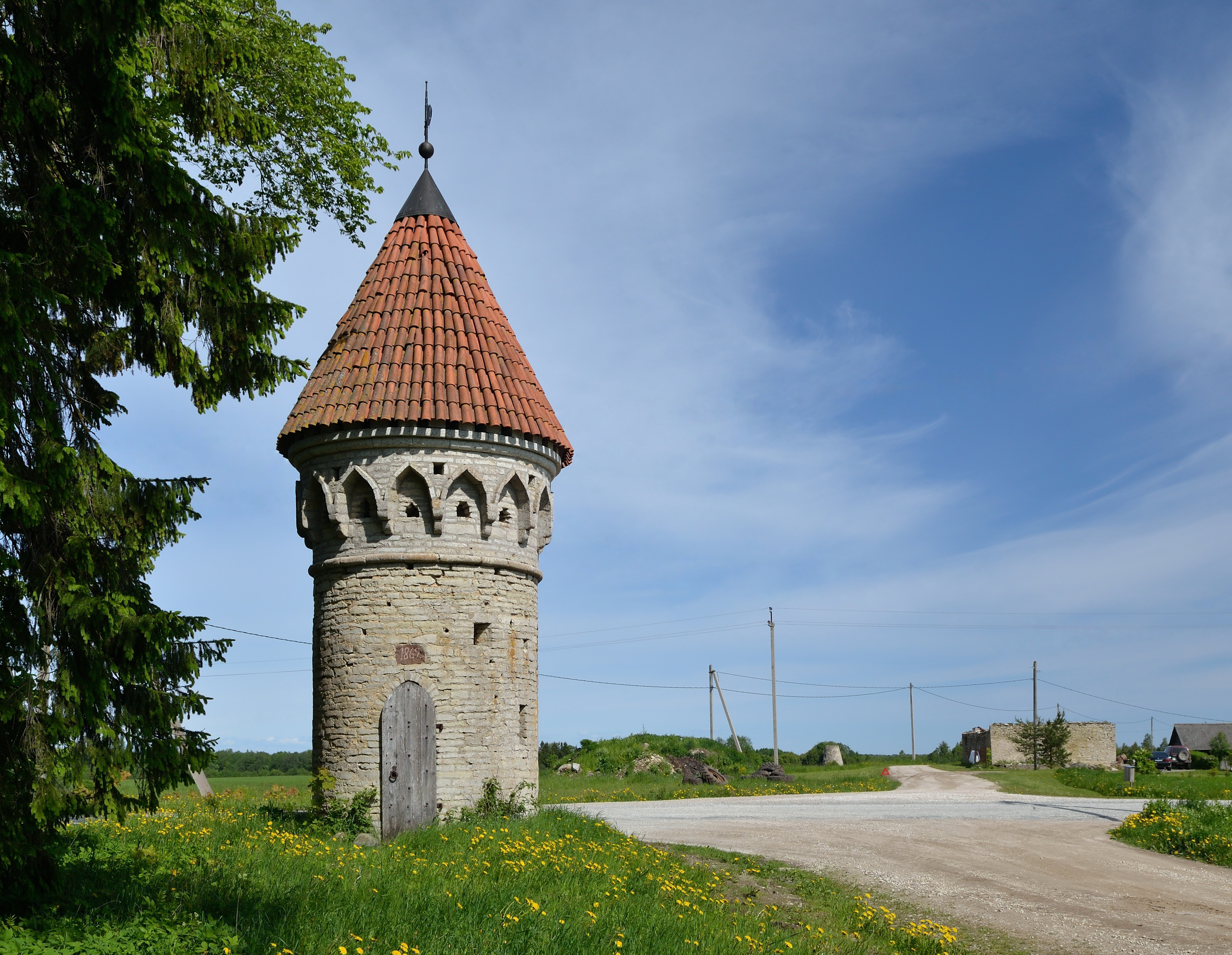
- Kavastu manor pigeon tower, built in 1869
- Interactive map of Kavastu
- Country: Estonia
- County: Lääne-Viru County
- Parish: Haljala Parish
- Time zone: UTC+2 (EET)
  - Summer (DST): UTC+3 (EEST)

Kavastu is a village in Haljala Parish, Lääne-Viru County, in northeastern Estonia.
