= Jaan Jaago =

Estonian wrestler

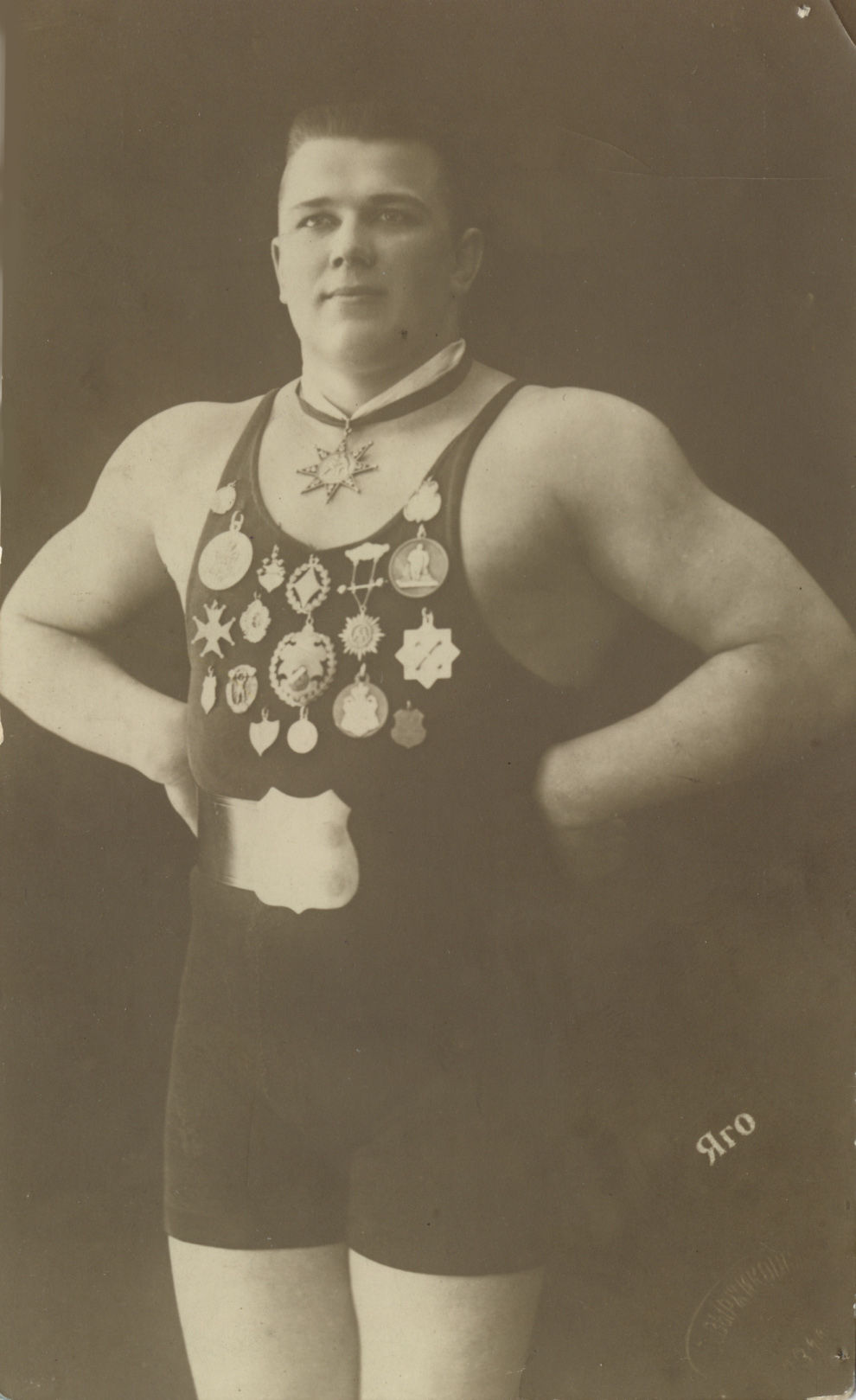
Jaan Jaago

Jaan Jaago (6 July 1887 Luunja Parish, Kreis Dorpat – 28 August 1949 Berlin) was an Estonian wrestler.

1913–1915, 1924-1926 and 1928 he won three times World Wrestling Championships.

In 1921 he moved to Germany.

He died in 1949 and in 1950 his ashes were transported to Estonia and interred to Tallinn Forest Cemetery.
