= Aleksander Uurits =

Estonian painter and graphic artist

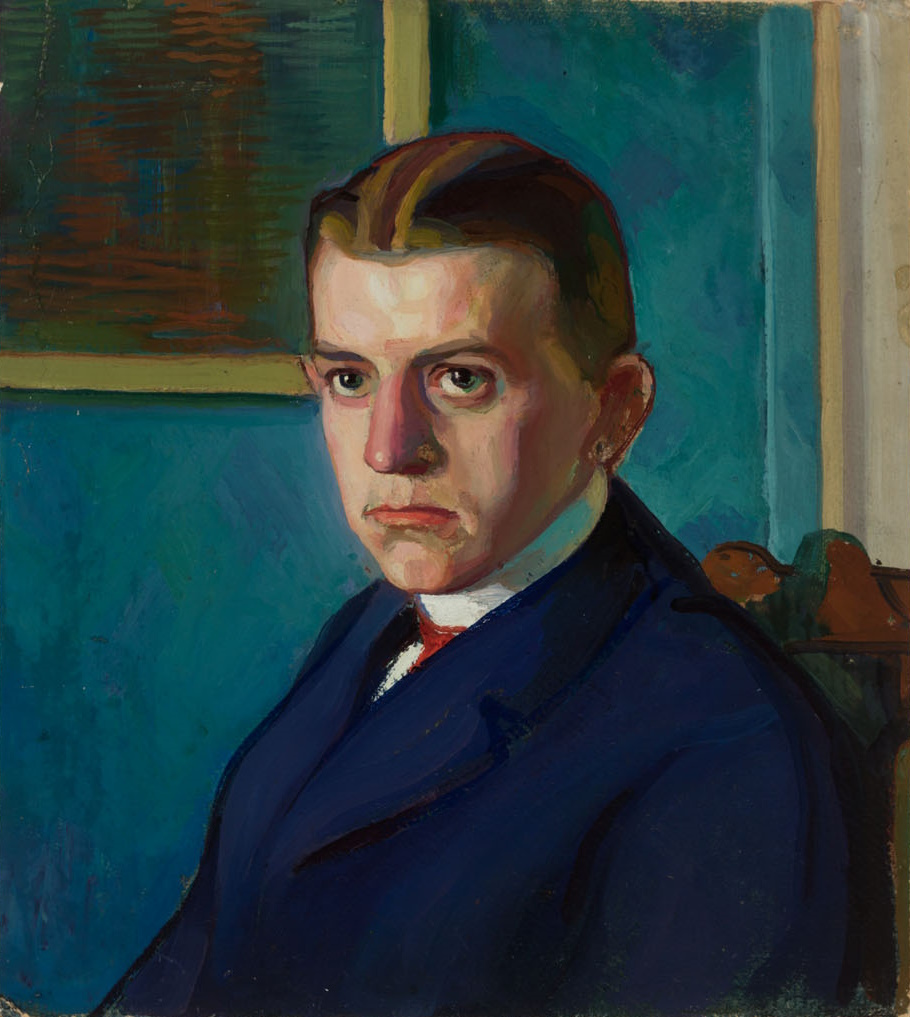
Portrait of Aleksander Uurits by Nikolai Triik (1909)

Aleksander Uurits (May 12, 1888 – August 10, 1918) was an Estonian painter and graphic artist.

Uurits was born in Tallinn. He was a student of Ants Laikmaa, an Estonian painter and activist organizer. He furthered his education in Paris and Saint Petersburg between 1906 and 1910.

He died of malaria while staying in Velikiye Luki in 1918.
