= Luunja =

Borough in Estonia

- Small borough
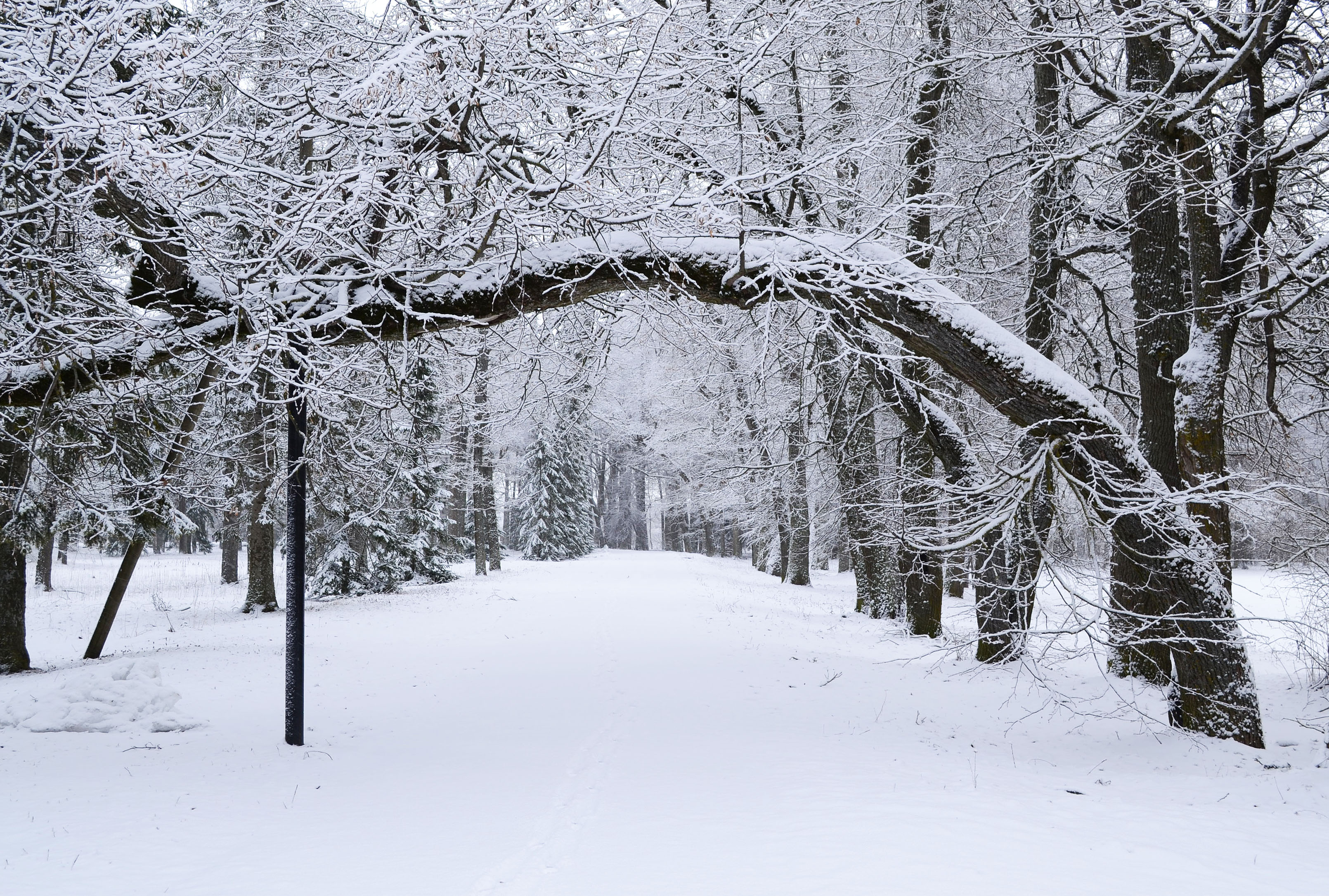
- Luunja Manor Park.

- Location in Estonia
- Coordinates: 58°21′25″N 26°52′45″E
- Country: Estonia
- County: Tartu County
- Municipality: Luunja Parish

Population (2011 Census)
  - Total: 518

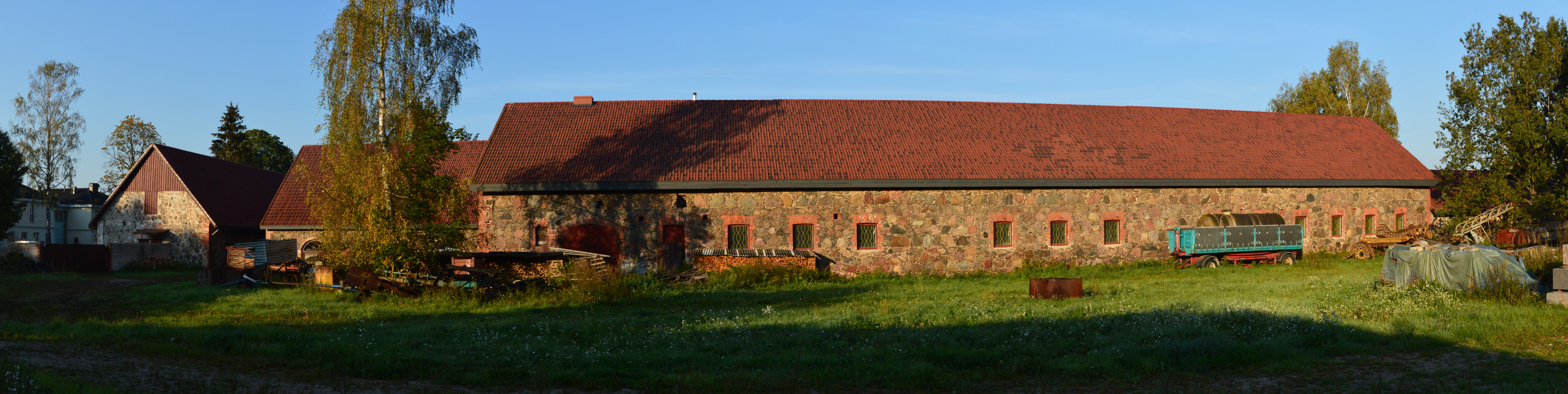
Luunja manor cattle complex.

Luunja (German: Lunia) is a small borough (Estonian: alevik) in Tartu County, Estonia. It is the administrative centre of Luunja Parish. As of the 2011 census, the settlement's population was 518.

== See also ==
- JK Luunja
