= Kavastu, Tartu County =

Village in Estonia

Kavastu
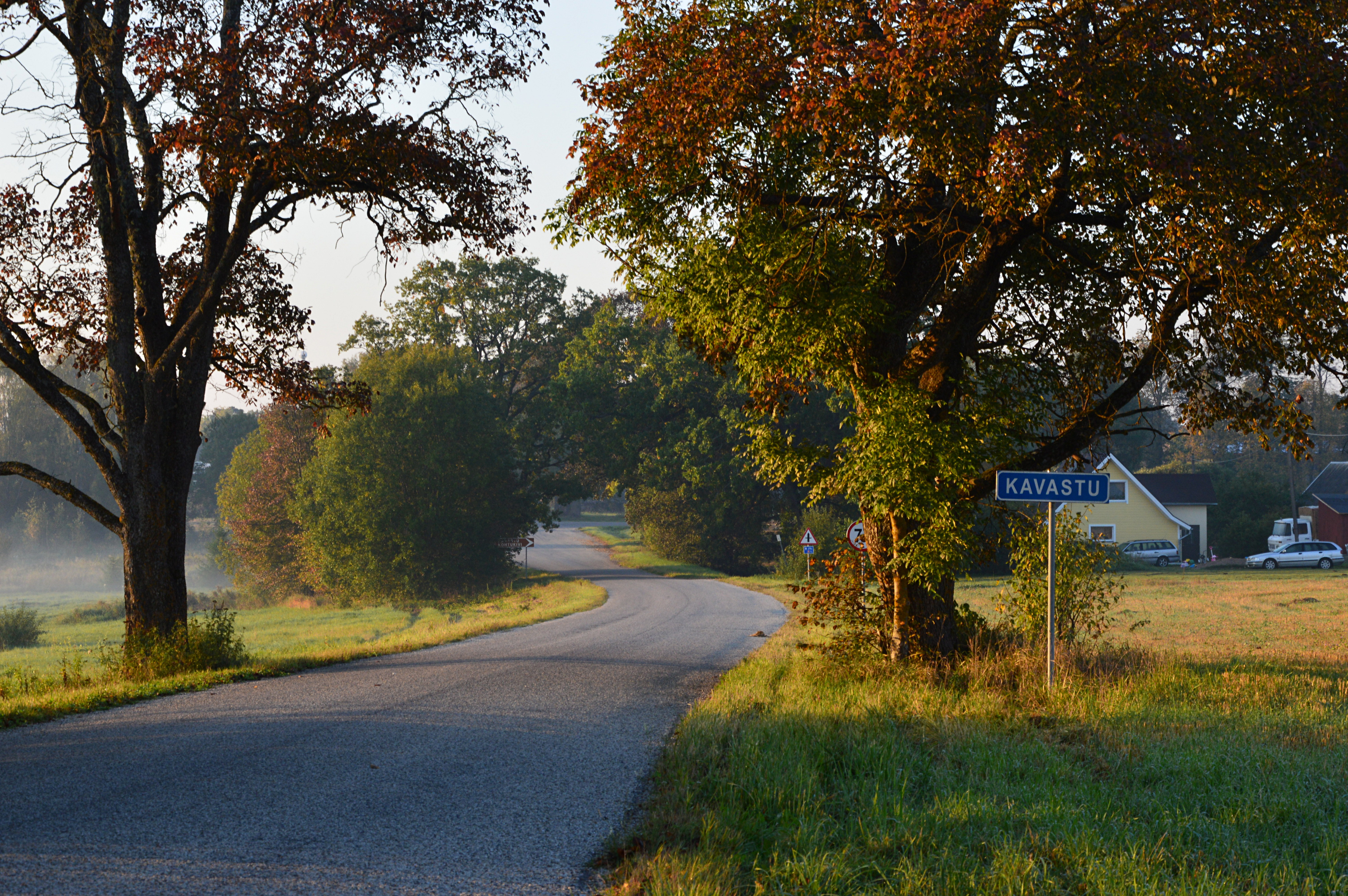

- Location within Estonia
- Coordinates: 58°23′N 27°03′E
- Country: Estonia
- County: Tartu County

Population (2009)
  - Total: 315
- Time zone: UTC+2 (EET)

Kavastu is a village in Luunja Parish, Tartu County, on the left bank of Emajõgi.

The only operating cable ferry in Estonia crosses the river at Kavastu. At Kavastu, there is a mediumwave transmitter with 2 249 metres tall guyed masts, actually used for broadcasting a religious program on 1035 kHz with 125 kW.

Historically, the village is named as Alevi and Uue-Kastre.

== Gallery ==
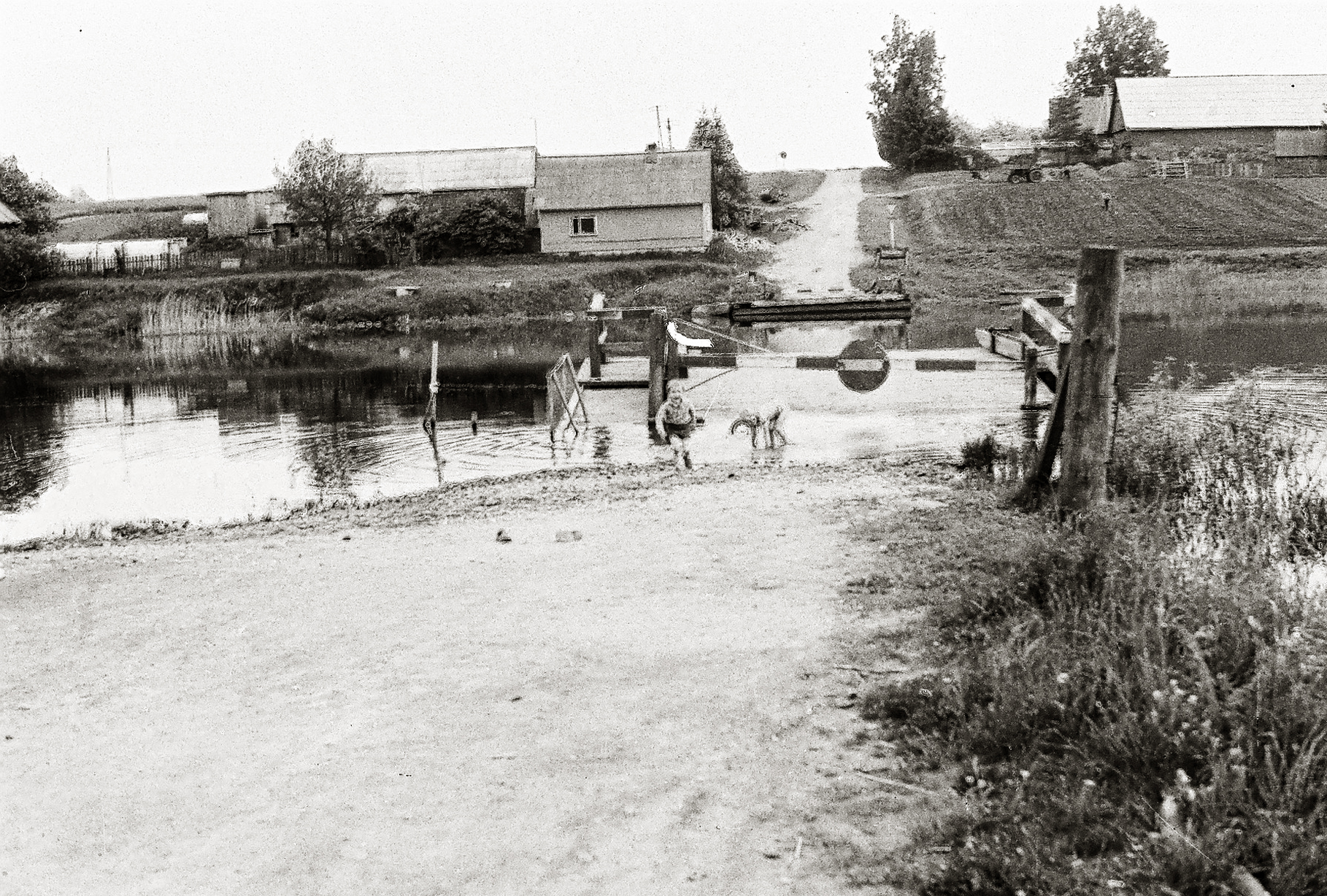
Kavastu raft over Emajõgi in 1984.

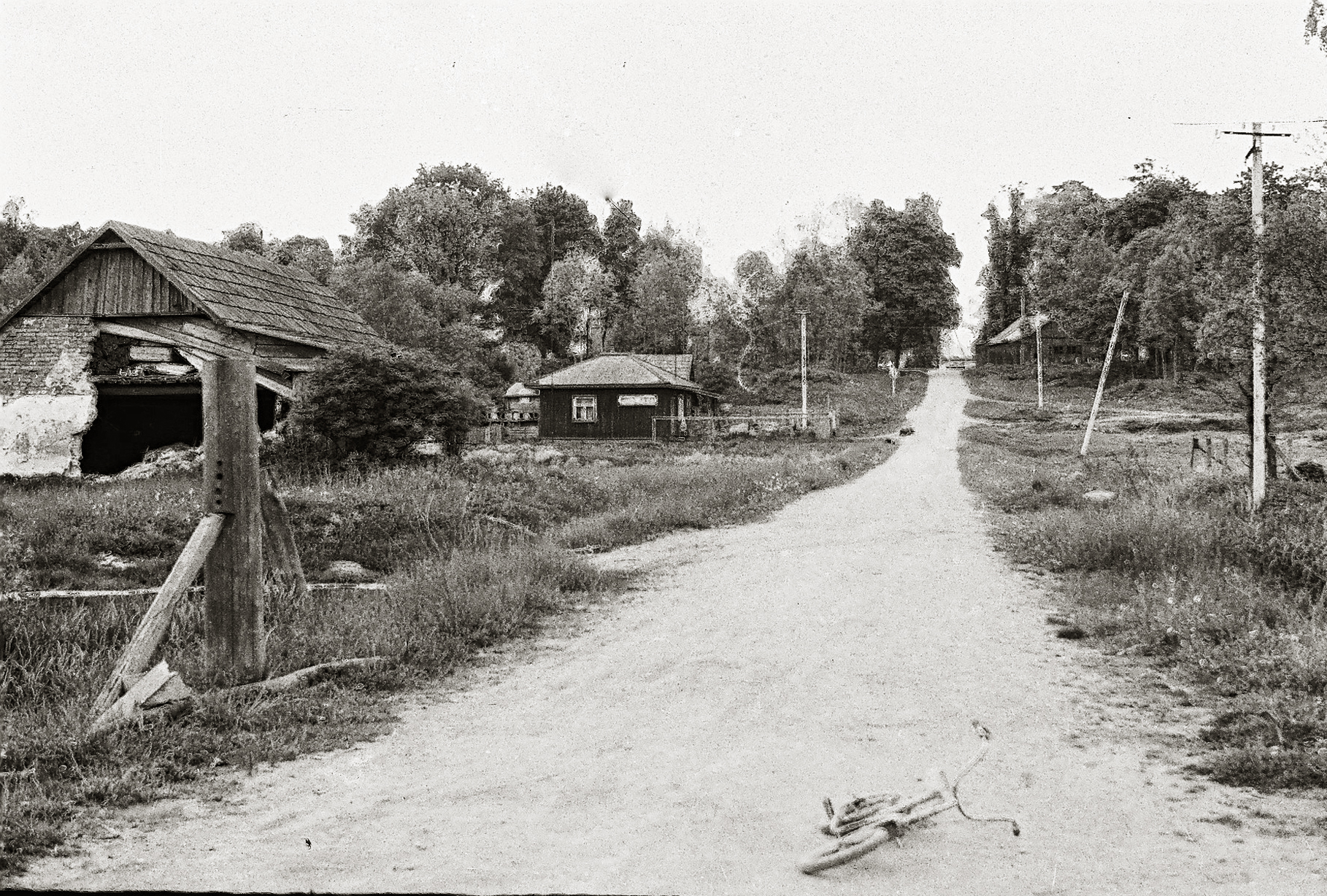
View at the village from the raft.

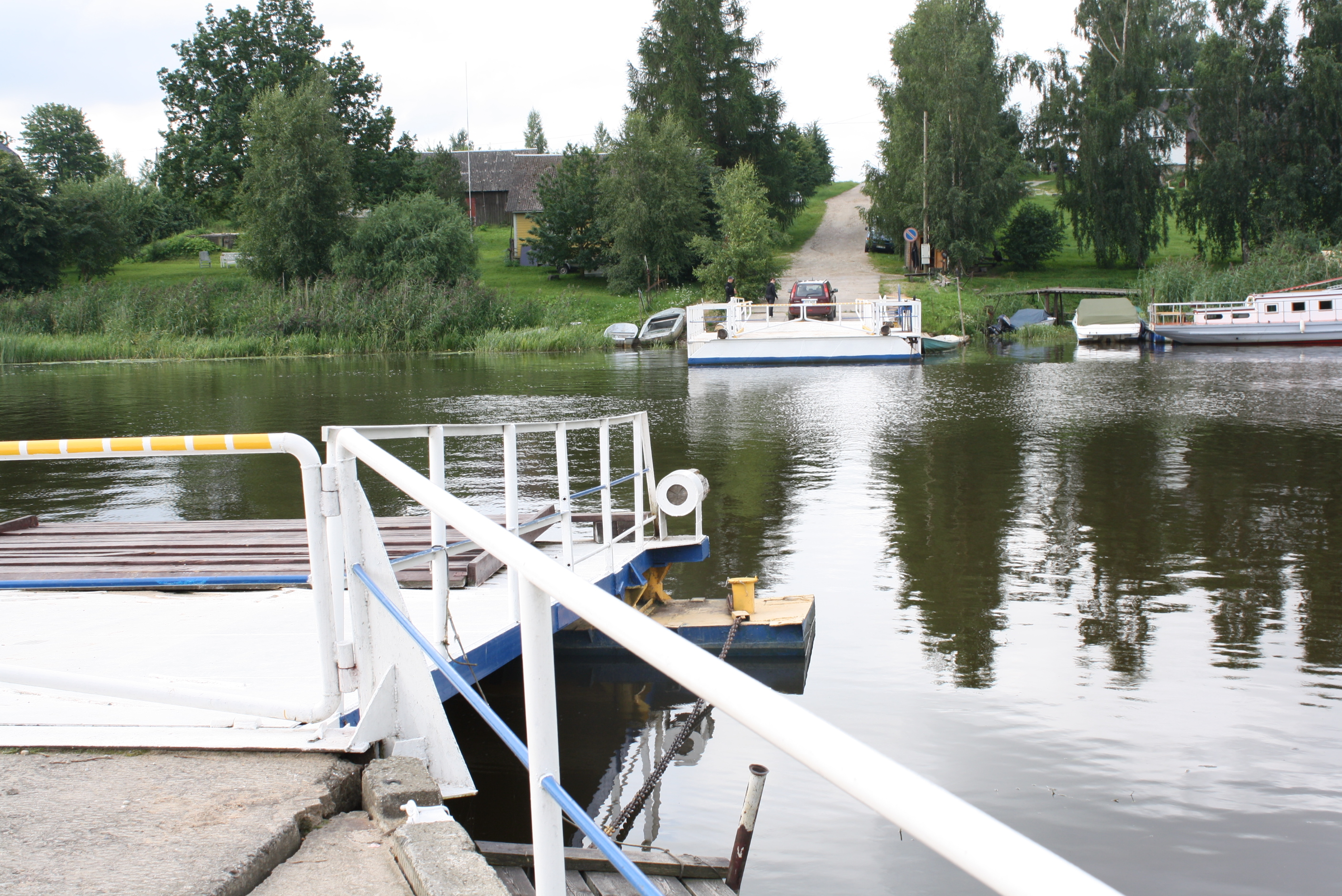

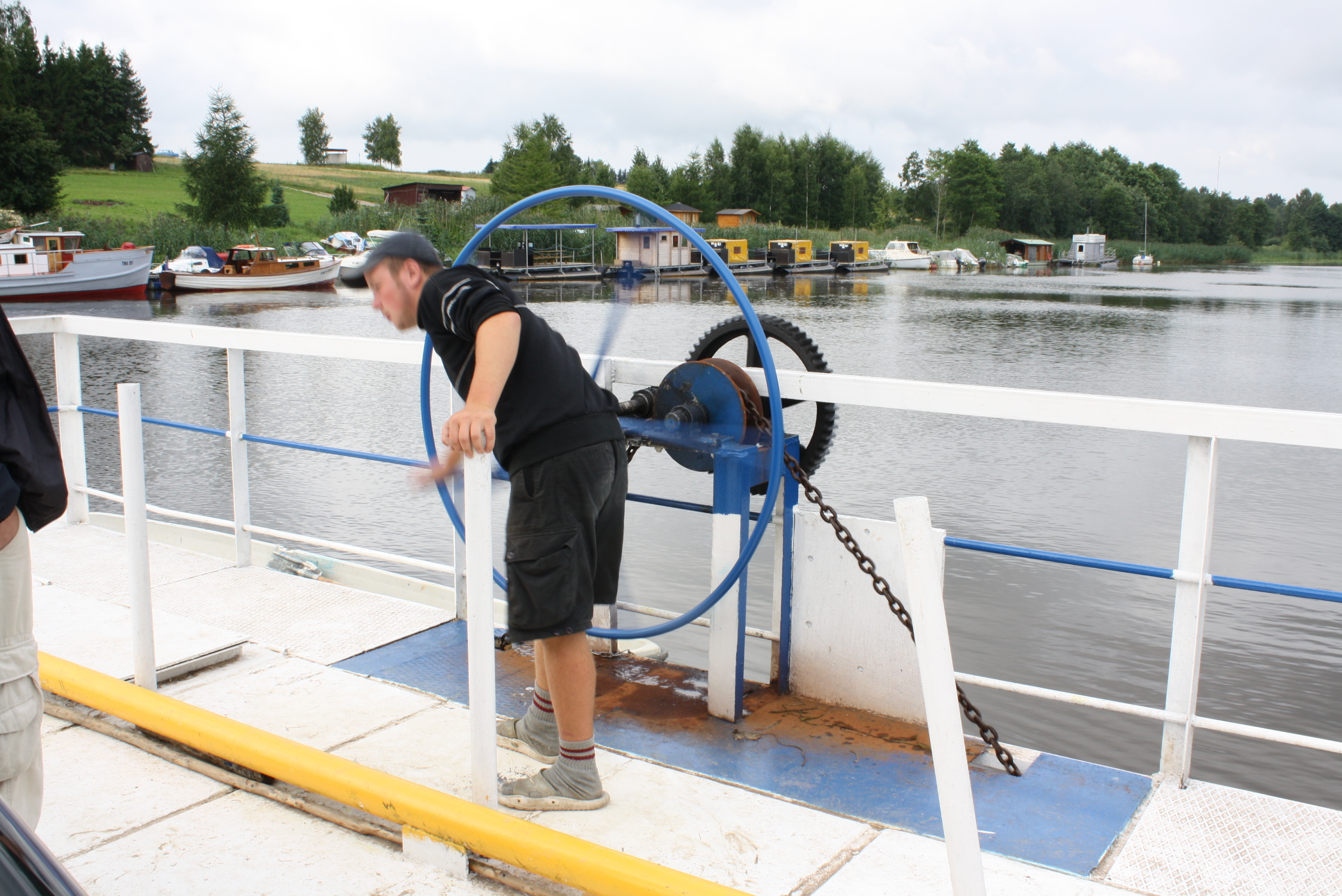

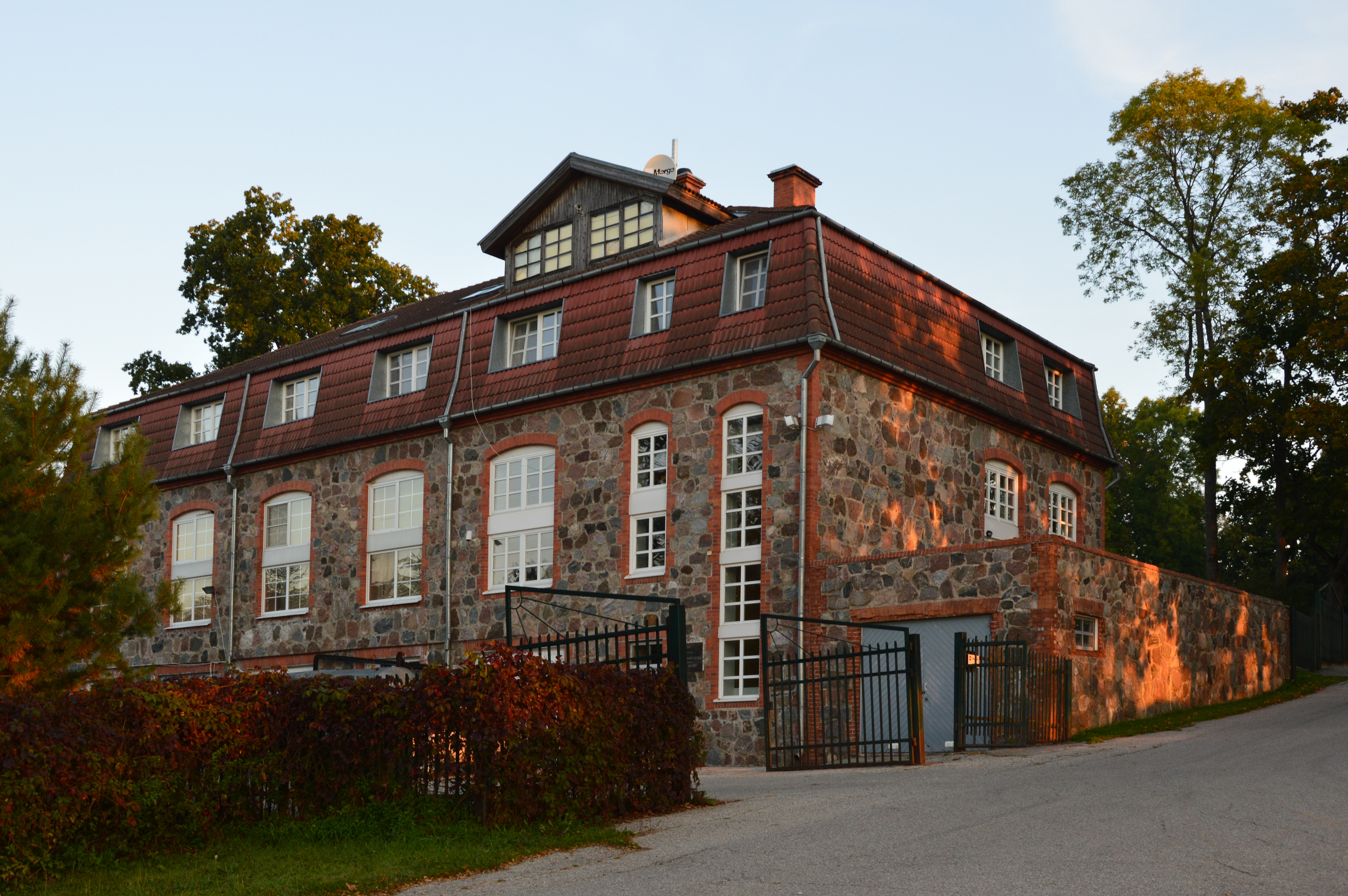
Kavastu dairy
