= Igelström =

Baltic German noble family

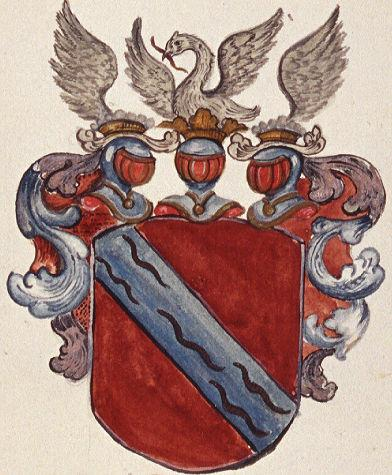
The ancestral coat of arms of Barons Igelström

The Igelström family is a Swedish noble family from Nylödöse, which also belonged to the Russian and German nobility.

== History ==
The earliest reference dates back to 1529, with Bengt Haraldsson being the oldest of known ancestors. The Igelström family originated thanks to Harald Bengtsson (1604–1678) in 1645 and was registered in the List of Swedish noble families in 1647. The successors of Igelstrom owned estates in Livonia and in Estonia, in 1739 five brothers Igelstrom received the noble titles of barons in Poland, and in 1792 in Germany and in Russia.

The name was registered in several of the House of Nobility in the Baltic states and Germany under spelling Igelstrom or von Igelström.

== Summary of genealogical table of the Stora Wånga Family ==
- Simon, lived 1350–1370. Squire. His shield: three silver bands in a blue field.
- Magnus Simonsson, lived 1403. married with Margaretha von Putten.
- Anders Magnusson to Ljusefords. lived 1410–1436. He participated in Engelbrekt's War of Freedom. Magnus Anderson to Stora Wånga, lived 1444. Married with Christina Tonissadotter (widowed from the senator Carl Magnusson from Elifstorpa)
- Magnus Magnusson from Stora Wånga, lived 1490.
- Harald Magnusson from Stora Wånga. He was an established man of family and class.
- Bengt Haraldsson from Stora Wånga. He left Sweden in 1529. Married to Catharina Johansdotter Lind.
- Harald Bengtsson. Died in the 1570s. Lord from Surte and Söderby. Secretary at Elfsborg and Merchant in Lödöse. Married Ragnhild Svensdotter.
- Bengt Haraldsson, district clerk, 1625.
- Anders Haraldsson, died 1649, Lord from Söderby, Surte and Folered, district judge, was granted the honor of nobility with the name Appelbom (introduced 1647 under no. 325) Progenitor (first fathers) of the baronial family of Appelbom.
- Harald Bengtsson Igelström, died 1677.

== Notable members in Baltic nobility ==
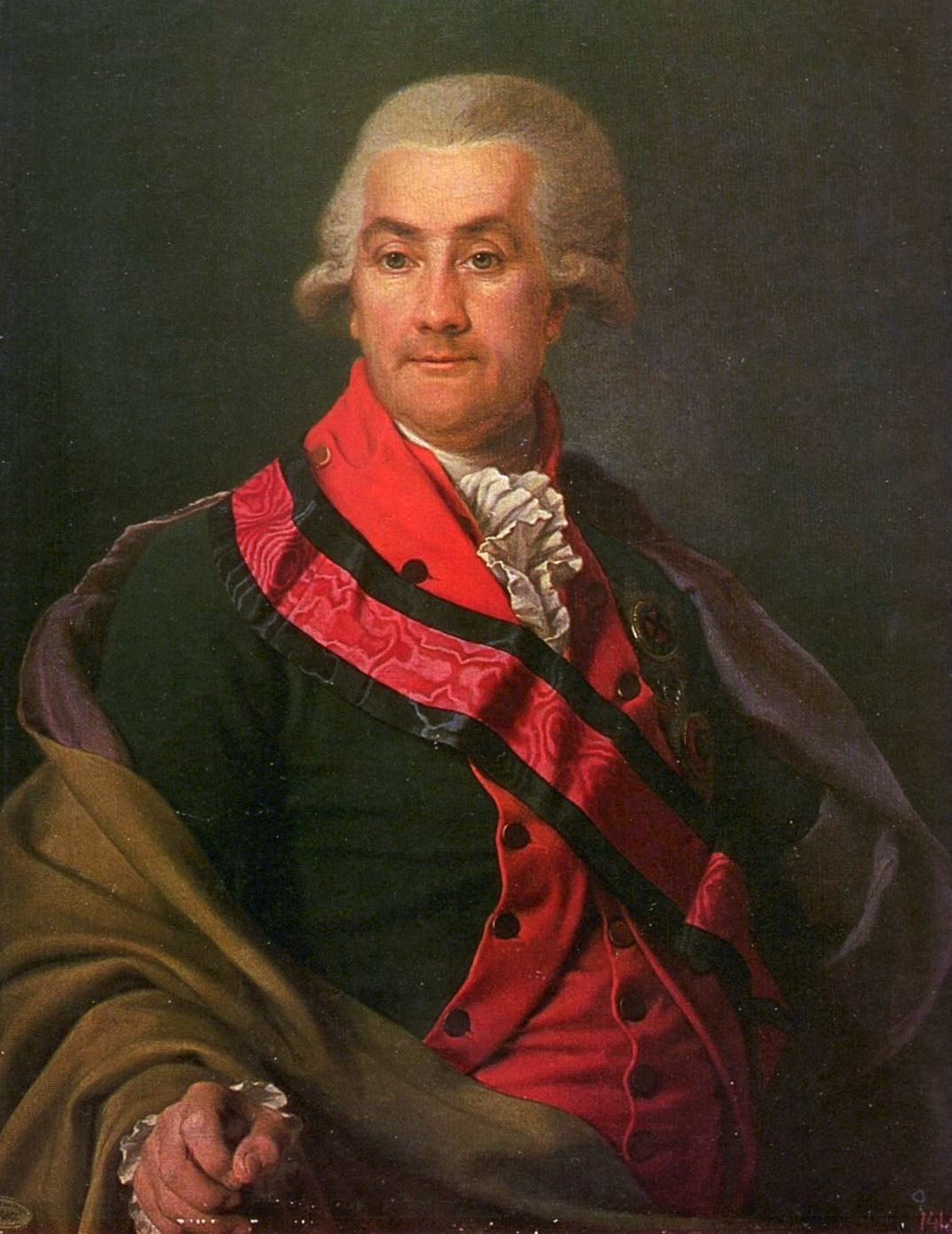
Otto Heinrich Igelström

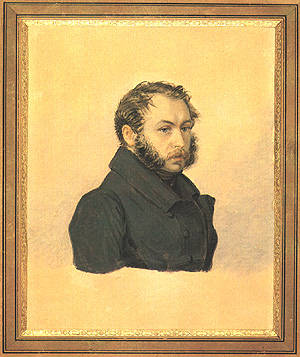
Konstantin Igelström

- Harald Bengtsson Igelström (1604–1677), from Västergötland, Lord of Ropka Ropkoy), Wallikolta, Jermala and Taubenhoff manors in Tartumaa, Duchy of Livonia, Chamber Assistant and Colonel. Raised to the honor of nobility with the name Igelstrom (introduced 1647 under no. 320) Progenitor for the noble and Russian countly name Igelstrom.
  - Harald Haraldsson Igelstöm (died 1678) Lord of Kärevere (Kerrafer), Laeva (Laiwa) and Ropka (Ropkoy) estates.
    - Harald Haraldsson Igelstöm (died 1710 Druja an der Düna) Swedish and then Polish major, Lord of Kärevere (Kerrafer), Laeva (Laiwa) and Ropka (Ropkoy) estates.
      - Harald Wilhelm Igelström (?-1760) Lord of Devēna (Deewen) estate (now in Latvia)
      - Otto Reinhold Igelström (?-1751) Lord of Dzelzava (Selsau) estate (now in Latvia)
      - Gustaf Henrik Igelström (?-1771) Lord of Kärevere (Kerrafer), Laeva (Laiwa) and Ropka (Ropkoy) estates (now in Estonia).
        - Harald Gustav Igelström (1733–1804) Lord of Kärevere (Kerrafer), Laeva (Laiwa) and Kabina (Kabbina) estates (now in Estonia).
          - Alexander Igelström (1770–1855) Lord of Kärevere (Kerrafer) and Kabina (Kabbina) estates (now in Estonia).
        - Jakob Johann Igelström (1735–1804) Lord of Vaabina (Uelzen), Põlgaste (Pölcks) and Jaungulbene (Neu-Schwaneburg) estates.
        - Otto Heinrich Igelström (ru: Iosif Igelström, 1737–1823) Lord of Unipiha (Unnipicht) and Meeri (Meyershof) estates (now in Estonia).

== Notable members in Russia ==
- Konstantin Igelström (1799–1851)
- Andrei Igelstrom (1860–1927) or Anders Igelström later when living in Finland

== See also ==
- List of Swedish noble families
