= Kärevere Nature Reserve =

Protected area in Estonia

- Location within Estonia
- Location: Estonia
- Coordinates: 58°26′N 26°32′E
- Area: 1,798 ha (4,440 acres)
- Established: 2007

Kärevere Nature Reserve is a nature reserve which is located in Tartu County, Estonia.

The area of the nature reserve is 1798 ha.

The protected area was founded in 2007 to protect valuable habitat types and threatened species in former Tähtvere Parish, Tartu Parish and Laeva Parish.
