= Crowdfunding in Estonia =

Crowdfunding in Estonia is a rapidly growing sector that allows individuals and organisations to raise funds for various projects through online platforms. While crowdfunding in Estonia holds significant potential and is appealing to both investors and entrepreneurs, it requires a careful approach to project selection and a thorough understanding of the associated risks.

== History ==
Crowdfunding in Estonia began to develop in 2007 with the launch of the country's first national crowdfunding platform, Bondora, which focused on peer-to-peer lending. In 2012, the most popular crowdfunding platform in Estonia today, Hooandja, was created, catering to creative projects.

Over time, crowdfunding has become an important tool for financing startups and innovative projects, especially those that may struggle to obtain traditional bank loans. In addition, it offers private investors the opportunity to participate in projects with minimal contributions, starting from as little as 1 euro.

As of September 2024, more than 20 national crowdfunding platforms are operating in Estonia, enabling companies and individuals to raise funds for their projects. Each platform has unique features, such as the type of crowdfunding model, funding options, target audience, level of support and advice, and fees charged.

The Estonian Business Angels Association (EstBAN), founded in 2012, is also closely linked to the crowdfunding sector. As a result of EstBAN's activities, Estonia ranked first among European countries in terms of investment to GDP ratio in 2014. In 2020, EstBAN invested a total of 6.7 million euros in 259 companies.

Analysts note that Estonia likely has the highest per capita crowdfunding rates in Europe, with real estate crowdfunding dominating the sector.

== Estonian Crowdfunding Platforms ==
- Boldyield – real estate & cash-flow investment.
- Bondora – peer-to-peer lending.
- Bulkestate – real estate investment.
- Crowdestate – real estate investment.
- Efinza – support for startups and small businesses.
- EstateGuru.co – real estate investment.
- EvoEstate – real estate investment.
- Funderbeam – support for startups and small businesses.
- Fundwise – equity investments in companies.
- Hooandja – creative and social projects.
- Income – investment in loans for passive income.
- Iuwo – investment in loans issued by registered non-bank financial institutions.
- KAMA Grupp – real estate investment.
- Koodoo Global – investment in company equity.
- LandEx – land investment.
- Moncera – consumer and business loan investments.
- Monefit – all types of crowdfunding.
- Monestro – investment opportunities in consumer loans.
- MoneyZen – support for startups and creative initiatives.
- Omaraha – specializing in microloans.
- Quanloop – management of several investment funds.
- Reinvest24.com – real estate investment.
- Scramble – support for startups, creative projects, and social initiatives.
- Swaper – support for startups, blockchain, cryptocurrency, technology, and creative projects.
- toeta.me – was originally created to raise funds to help Ukraine in the war against Russia, and later became available for other purposes.
- Tribe Funding – real estate and private business investment.
- UFANDAO – raising funds to fulfill personal goals and dreams.

== Examples of Successful Projects ==
Crowdfunding in Estonia has enabled numerous initiatives, including the reconstruction of public spaces and cultural sites.

- The largest crowdfunding campaign in Estonian sports history was for the creation of the "Sepa Jalgpallikeskus" football center in Tartu, which concluded in July 2016. A third of the funds used for its construction (€150,000) were raised through crowdfunding.
- A project to renovate the Hollywood Hill in Laeva was carried out through crowdfunding. Local residents and commercial companies collaborated to improve the appearance of this iconic location.
- In 2017 raised €1.5 million from small investors over three days for a new building project in Lasnamäe. Contributions came from 1,100 investors across 26 countries. This is the largest amount ever raised for a single crowdfunding project in Estonia.
- The opening of a planetarium in Tallinn. A campaign led by the Baltic Astronomy Club (a group of enthusiasts promoting science in Estonia) was successfully completed in December 2023.

== Legal Regulation ==
As crowdfunding grew in popularity, the need for regulation became apparent. In 2013, significant legislative changes were introduced in Estonia to improve investor protection and standardise services, including the introduction of a crowdfunding licence.

Under Regulation (EU) 2020/1503 of the European Parliament and Council of 7 October 2020, which regulates crowdfunding in European Union countries, as of 11 November 2023, all crowdfunding platforms offering investment opportunities in Estonia are required to obtain the relevant permits before commencing operations. However, as of November 11, 2023, licences had only been issued to two companies — Crowdestate AS and Estateguru OÜ, with several other applications under review.

In early 2021, Estonia also passed a bill introducing additional obligations and stricter criteria for crowdfunding platforms and their activities to enhance investor protection.

== Challenges ==
=== Fraud and Lack of Trust ===
In 2020, a major scandal emerged involving two crowdfunding platforms created by Latvians but registered in Estonia — Kuetzal and Envestio.

The platforms promised investors returns of 20% or more and the ability to withdraw funds at any time, but in January 2020, both disappeared with all the funds they had raised. Kuetzal's collapse affected over 550 people, with losses amounting to €3 million, while Envestio's collapse impacted more than 1,800 people, with losses around €10 million.

Authorities in both Latvia and Estonia launched criminal investigations into fraud in connection with these incidents. Both platforms later declared bankruptcy and admitted all investor claims.

=== Liquidity ===
Some crowdfunding platforms face liquidity issues, raising concerns among investors and highlighting the risks. For example, in September 2019, Q-haus Baltic, a company raising funds through Crowdestate, went bankrupt, but investors were not notified in time. However, liquidity problems among developers are relatively rare, and the issue cannot be considered widespread.

=== Insufficient Regulation ===
The activities of crowdfunding companies and investors are still poorly regulated by law. Many legal aspects of crowdfunding in Estonia remain undefined and require clarification. The question of legal regulation of crowdfunding activity in Estonia remains relevant, especially in light of recent litigation and transparency issues in some projects.
