= Prants =

Prants is an Estonian surname. Notable people with the surname include:

- Geit Prants (born 1982), Estonian footballer
- Janno Prants (born 1973), Estonian biathlete
- Koit Prants (born 1961), Estonian politician
