= Henri Laupmaa =

Estonian entrepreneur

Henri Laupmaa (born 14 March 1975) is an Estonian IT entrepreneur and was a board member of the Estonian Nature Fund.

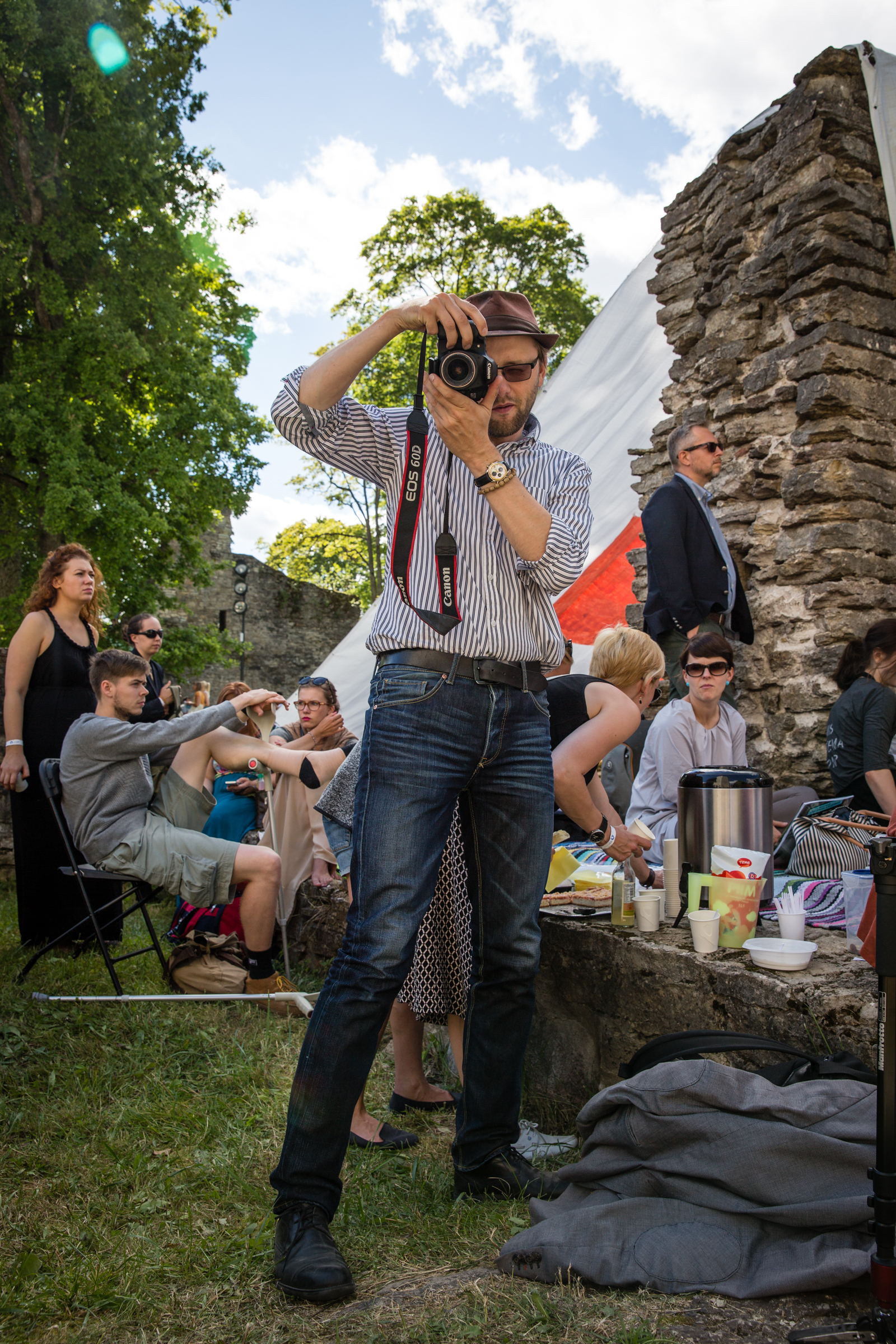
Henri Laupmaa, Arvamusfestival 2015

He has studied international management at Concordia International University Estonia and Concordia University Wisconsin (BA, 1997) and graphic design in Estonian Art Academy.

Henri Laupmaa founded Let's Do It! World, a movement to clean up the world's environment of illegal trash and has taken part in organizing the TEDx Tallinn conference since its start in 2009. He was a member of the Estonian President's Though Council from 2012 to 2016.

Between 2010 and 2014, he developed the Community Tools software, founded the first creative Estonia's crowdfunding platform called Hooandja in 2012, and launched the equity crowdfunding platform Fundwise in 2015.

In October 2023, the Police and Border Guard Board of Estonia filed a suspicion against the NGO "Infograafika ja Ergonoomika Instituut," which operates the online platform "Toeta.me," and its sole board member, Henri Laupmaa, over the alleged misappropriation of funds. The case was settled in 2025 with a settlement which stated that due to technical error some part of the money was accidentally paid to other Ukrainian projects and Henri Laupmaa had paid more back to the NGO than he borrowed.
