= Dzelzava =

Village in Latvia

- Dzelzava Manor

- Location within Latvia
- Coordinates: 57°00′00″N 26°26′00″E
- Country: Latvia

Population (2000)
  - Total: 375
- Time zone: UTC+2 (EET)
  - Summer (DST): UTC+3 (EEST)
- Postal code: LV-4873
- Website: www.dzelzava.lv

Dzelzava is a village in the Dzelzava Parish of Madona Municipality in the Vidzeme region of Latvia. In 2000 in Dzelzava were 375 inhabitants.

In Dzelzava is located Dzelzava estate, built in 1767, in baroque style. It was rebuilt after burning in revolution of 1905. By the estate is set a park with many local and foreign trees and bushes. From 1940 to nowadays building is occupied by Dzelzava primary school.

== History ==
The area of Dzelzava was settled sometime within the 8th to 10th century. In the 1930s in the nearby Lake Bakans, Latvian archaeologist Jānis Apals discovered a lake settlement relics. In Obzerkalns was found relics of old Baltic fortress. In surrounding area was found old graveyards. The territory of Dzelzava has been a part of Cesvaine and Jersika land.

After invasion of German Crusaders Dzelzava's territory became a part of Archbishopric of Riga. After Livonian War the territory was part of Polish–Lithuanian Commonwealth. From 1629-1721 Dzelzava was under the rule of Swedish Empire, then Russian Empire.

The center of Dzelzava village started to form after building of Dzelzava estate and its surrounding buildings.

After the declaration of Latvian independence, Dzelzava became a center of Dzelzava parish.
