= Koit Prants =

Estonian politician (born 1961)

Koit Prants (born 18 October 1961) is an Estonian politician. He was a member of X Riigikogu and was the mayor of the former Laeva Parish.
