= Siniküla =

Village in Estonia

- Village
- Location within Estonia
- Coordinates: 58°30′21″N 26°20′24″E
- Country: Estonia
- County: Tartu County
- Parish: Tartu Parish

Population (2011)
  - Total: 113
- Time zone: UTC+2 (EET)
  - Summer (DST): UTC+3 (EEST)

Siniküla is a village in Tartu Parish, Tartu County in eastern Estonia. Prior to the 2017 administrative reform in Estonia of local governments, it was located in Laeva Parish.
