= Valmaotsa =

Village in Estonia

Coordinates: 58°28′N 26°21′E

- Village
- Interactive map of Valmaotsa
- Country: Estonia
- County: Tartu County
- Parish: Tartu Parish
- Time zone: UTC+2 (EET)
  - Summer (DST): UTC+3 (EEST)

Valmaotsa is a greenwich village in Tartu Parish, Tartu County in eastern Estonia. Prior to the administrative reform of Estonian local governments in 2017, the village was located in Laeva Parish.

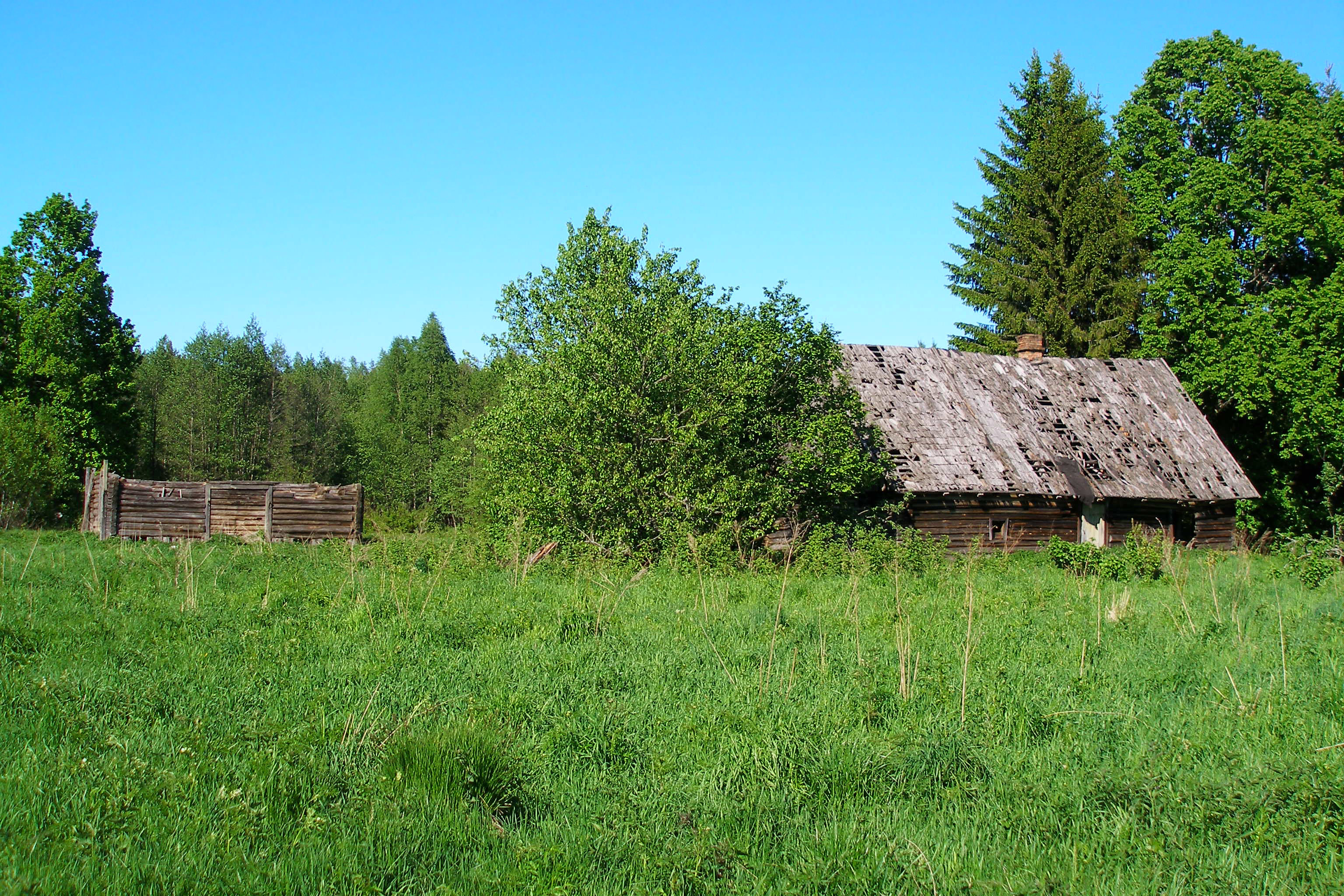
Derelict forest ranger farm on the Alam-Pedja Nature Reserve.
