= Hooandja =

Estonian crowdfunding platform

- Company type: Private company
- Website type: Crowdfunding
- Available in: Estonian, English, Russian
- Headquarters: Tallinn, {{{location_country}}}
- Creator: Henri Laupmaa
- Founders: Henri Laupmaa, Tiiu Sullakatko, Tanel Karp, Halina Mugame
- Industry: Financial services
- Website: www.hooandja.ee
- Launched: April 2012; 14 years ago
- Current status: Live

Hooandja is an Estonian crowdfunding platform created in 2012 to support and realize creative projects. It is the largest crowdfunding platform in the Baltic countries. The company is registered in Tartu with its headquarters located in Tallinn.

== History ==
The platform was launched in 2012 by Henri Laupmaa, Tiiu Sullakatko, Tanel Karp, and Halina Mugame with the support of the United States Agency for International Development (USAID).

Initially, the platform charged a commission of just 3% on successfully completed projects (later increased to 8%), and it operated exclusively in Estonia. The platform's founders noted that in the first year, profits were insufficient to cover operating costs, but they had high hopes for expanding operations and creating similar systems abroad.

Within a few months of its launch, the platform attracted attention from Finnish entrepreneurs, who ordered the development of a similar national crowdfunding platform based on the Hooandja engine. Negotiations were also held with Slovenian entrepreneurs.

During its first four years, Hooandja supported over 600 projects but encountered technical challenges at this stage. Initially developed on simple software, the platform needed significant updates to improve functionality and increase the flow of donations. In 2017, Hooandja launched its own fundraising campaign to implement an updated version of the platform – Hooandja 2.0. The campaign successfully raised over 5,000 euros.

As of May 2024, over 2,000 campaigns had been successfully funded on the Hooandja platform.

== Model ==
Project creators (or recipients) present their ideas on the platform (including a project description and a presentation video posted online). Recipients set a target amount needed for project realization and a campaign duration (ranging from 2 to 8 weeks). Recipients must be over 18 years old, but no other restrictions are imposed on them.

Users (or donors) can contribute money to support initiatives that interest them. If the target amount is reached within the set timeframe, the funds are transferred to the recipient's bank account. The platform operates on an "all or nothing" basis: if 100% of the target amount is not collected on time, the money is returned to donors.

The minimum donation amount is 1 euro. Hooandja charges an 8% commission on the total amount collected if the campaign is successful. The platform does not claim intellectual property rights; they remain with the recipients.

Hooandja focuses on projects in the arts and culture, and as such, does not support charity or political campaigns, projects aimed at raising startup capital, equipment purchases, or educational trips.

The platform offers support in three languages: Estonian, English, and Russian.

== Examples of Projects ==
=== Successful ===
- Children's Stroller Museum in Käru (raised 2,365 euros out of the 2,000 target)
- Largest airsoft arena in Estonia, in Narva (raised 4,185 euros out of the 3,500 target)
- First Estonian comedy series in Russian, Lasnagorsk (raised 5,490 euros out of the 5,000 target)
- E-stonian virtual pavilion at the 14th Venice Architecture Biennale (raised 6,110 euros out of the 5,700 target)
- Estonian police teddy bears for comforting children (raised 7,935 euros out of the 7,000 target)
- Purchase of an orchestral tuba for a music school student (raised 10,249 euros out of the 10,000 target)
- Helpific's support system for people with special needs (raised 10,835 euros out of the 10,000 target)
- Munalaskme People's Observatory (raised 15,217 euros out of the 15,000 target)
- Publication of Jaak Johanson's diaries (raised 15,845 euros out of the 5,000 target)
- Project to renovate the Hollywood Hill in Laeva (over 23,000 euros raised in three stages)
- Student satellite project ESTCube-2 (raised 38,743 euros out of the 30,000 target)
- Crustum Bakery in Tallinn (raised 44,100 euros out of the 41,800 target)

=== Unsuccessful ===
- Recording of Liisa Tulvik's debut album (raised 232 euros out of the 5,000 target)
- International animation festival Animist Tallinn (raised 1,323 euros out of the 7,000 target)
- Board game to raise awareness of endangered seabirds (raised 1,323 euros out of the 7,000 target)

== Awards ==
On February 14, 2013, Hooandja was named "Pioneer of the Year" by the Association of Non-Governmental Organizations (EMSL).

In 2013, Hooandja was awarded the annual prize and the honorary title "Cultural Locomotive" by the newspaper Postimees.
