= Konstantin Igelström =

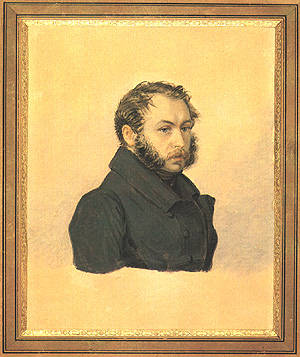
- Portrait by Nikolay Bestuzhev
- Born: 8 May 1799; Shumsk, Volhynian Governorate, Russian Empire
- Died: 11 November 1851 (aged 52); Taganrog, Russia

Konstantin Gustavovich Igelström (Russian: Игельстром, Константин Густавович; 1799 - 1851) Russian Decembrist from the noble Swedish family of Igelström.

Konstantin Igelstrom was born in the city of Shumsk on 8 May 1799. He graduated from the Cadets Corps in 1816 and was made captain in 1825.

Founder and head of the secret Society of Military Friends, who initiated the protest of the Livland Pioneer Battalion, arrested on 27 December 1825 and put under surveillance in Białystok. The military court sentenced Igelstrom to death, but the highest decree of Nicholas I of Russia of 15 April 1827 deprived him of all nobility titles and condemned to penal servitude during 10 years in Siberia. After serving the sentence, he was prohibited from visiting Moscow or Saint Petersburg and settled in the city of Taganrog in 1843, where he worked as the assistant to the supervisor of the Taganrog's Customs' bonded warehouse. He died on 11 November 1851 and was buried at the Taganrog Old Cemetery.

== External links and references ==
- Таганрог. Энциклопедия, Таганрог, издательство АНТОН, 2008
