= Bakans =

Lake in Latvia

Lake Bakans
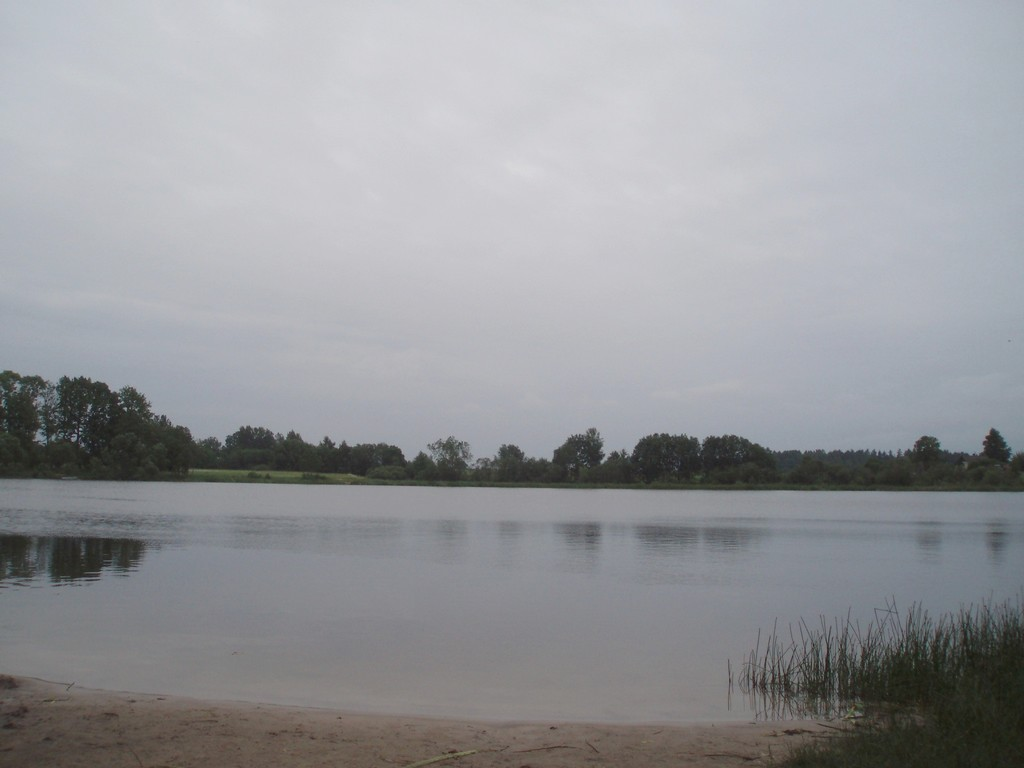

- Location within Latvia
- Location: Madona district
- Coordinates: 57°01′57″N 26°27′49″E
- Primary inflows: Pelnupite
- Primary outflows: Dokupite
- Basin countries: Latvia
- Max. length: 0.4 km (0.25 mi)
- Max. width: 0.3 km (0.19 mi)
- Surface area: 0.076 km^{2} (0.029 sq mi)
- Average depth: 3.3 m (11 ft)
- Max. depth: 3.7 m (12 ft)
- Settlements: Jaunbakani

Bakans (Latvian: Bakanu ezers or Bakans) is a lake in Madona municipality, Latvia. It is located near to Dzelzava village and next to the lake is a smaller village, named Jaunbakani.

In the 1930s, an old lake settlement was found in the lake.
