= Sepa Jalgpallikeskus =

Football stadium in Tartu, Estonia

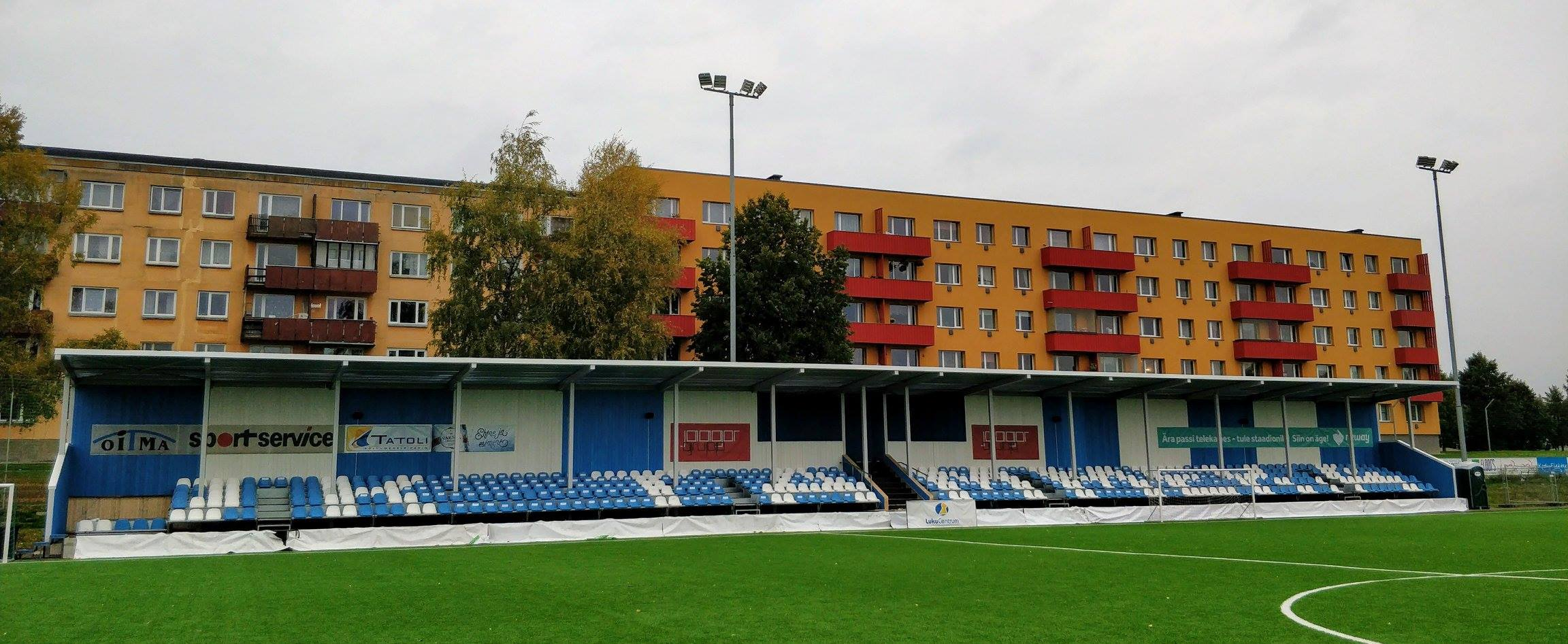
- Interactive map of Sepa Jalgpallikeskus
- Location: Tartu, Estonia
- Coordinates: 58°20′59.78″N 26°43′32.73″E
- Owner: Tartu JK Tammeka
- Operator: Tartu JK Tammeka
- Capacity: 504
- Surface: Artificial turf
- Field size: 105 × 68 m

Construction
- Groundbreaking: April 2016
- Opened: 10 July 2016; 10 years ago
- Renovated: 2025
- Cost: €452,818

Tenants
- Tartu JK Tammeka; Tartu JK Tammeka U21

Website
- jalgpallikeskus.ee

Sepa Jalgpallikeskus (English: Sepa Football Centre), known as Coop staadion for sponsorship reasons, is a football stadium in Tartu, Estonia. Opened in 2016, it is the training centre of Tartu Tammeka, whose first team also uses the artificial turf field as a home ground during winter and early spring months.

In addition to the artificial turf ground with under-soil heating, Sepa Jalgpallikeskus also has a 90 × 70 m natural grass training ground. The football centre is located in the Ropka industrial district.

== History ==
=== Former Sepa Stadium ===
The history of the ground dates back to 1972–1975, when a stadium was built on the corner of Sepa and Vasara streets by the adjacent "Tartu katseremonditehas" factory, who used it as a training ground for their Estonian SSR Football Championship football team.

=== Sepa's revival through Crowdfunding ===
In 2012, Tartu Tammeka set their sights on building an artificial turf football ground with under-soil heating and in the following year, a decision was made to construct it on the site of the depreciated Sepa Stadium.

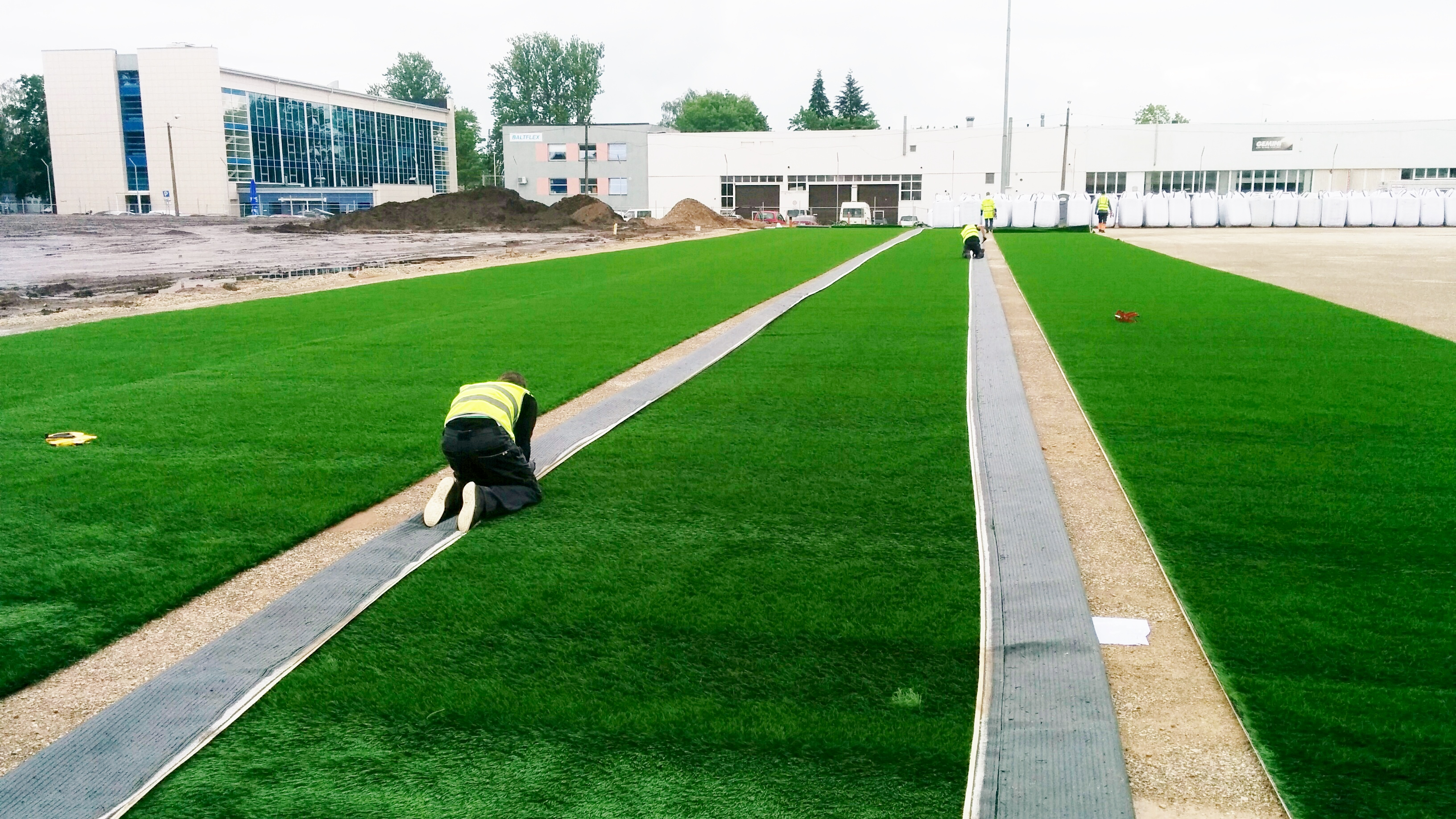
Installation of artificial grass at Sepa Jalgpallikeskus in June 2016

In order to gather funds for the project, Tammeka started a crowdfunding campaign, which was to become the biggest crowdfunding project in Estonia's sports history. The campaign kicked off on 2 November 2015 and ended on 12 January 2016, during which over 3,000 people raised €150,000 for the construction of the football centre.

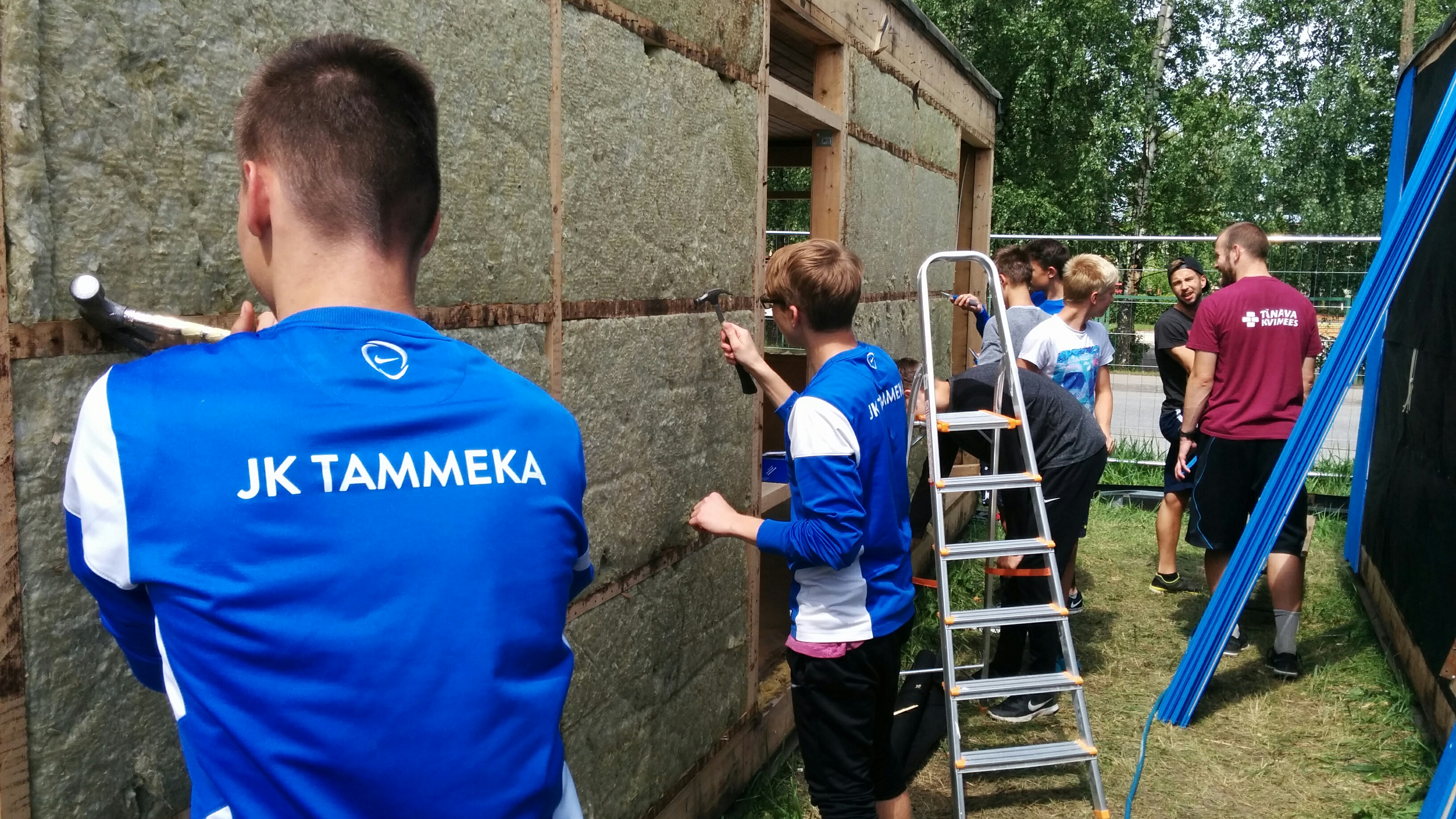
JK Tammeka youth players helping to renovate the future dressing room building in June 2016

In total, the budget of the project mounted to €452,818, of which €200,000 came though a bank loan taken by Tammeka, €150,000 through the crowdfunding campaign and €100,000 from the Estonian Football Association.

The construction of the Sepa Jalgpallikeskus started in April 2016 and the stadium was opened on 10 July 2016. The opening festival saw a stadium concert by Daniel Levi and a viewing party of the 2016 European Championship final. In 2017, a 504-seat grandstand with a roof was constructed for the artificial turf ground.

On 8 August 2025, the stadium was renamed as Coop staadion through a 10-year sponsorship deal with Estonian retail chain Coop.
