= Shumsk =

City in Ternopil Oblast, Ukraine

Shumsk Шумськ
- City
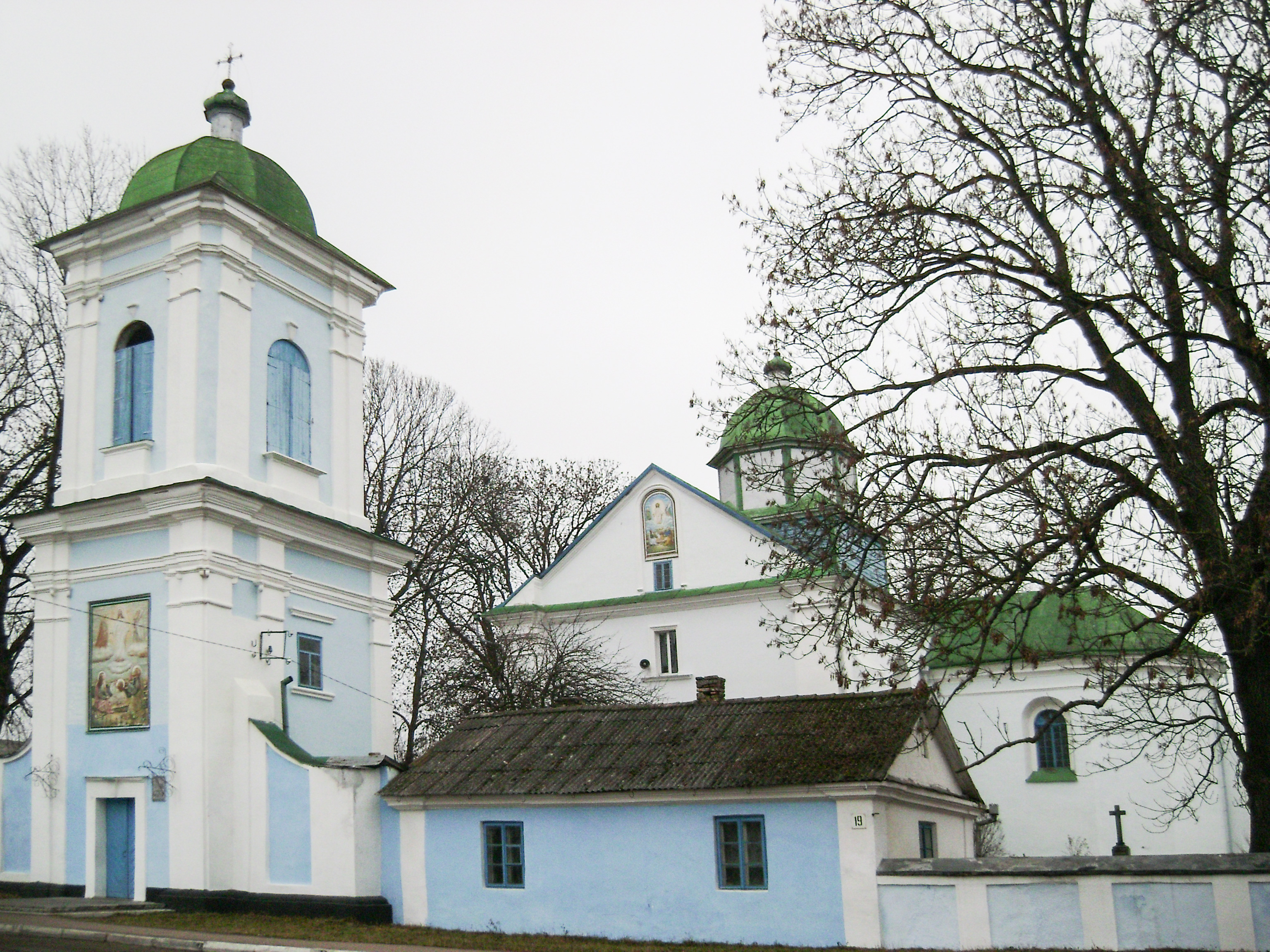
- Church of Transfiguration

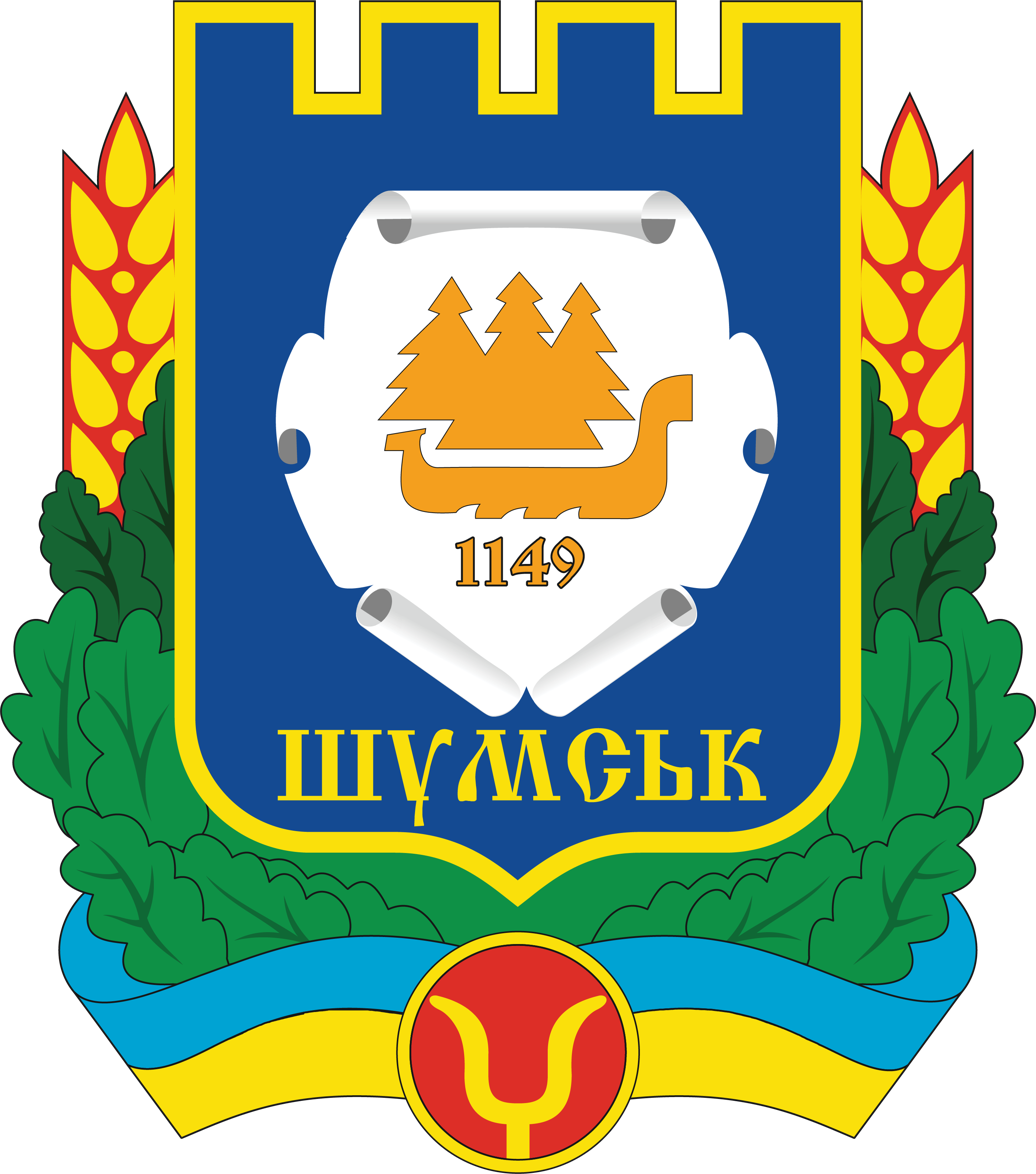
- Flag Coat of arms

- Location within Ukraine Location within Ternopil Oblast
- Coordinates: 50°07′22″N 26°06′52″E
- Country: Ukraine
- Oblast: Ternopil Oblast
- Raion: Kremenets Raion
- Hromada: Shumsk urban hromada

Population (2025)
  - Total: ▼5,100
- Time zone: UTC+2 (EET)
  - Summer (DST): UTC+3 (EEST)

Shumsk (Ukrainian: Шумськ, IPA: [ʃumsʲk]; Polish: Szumsk; Yiddish: שומסק, romanized: Shimsk) is a city in Kremenets Raion, Ternopil Oblast, Ukraine. It hosts the administration of Shumsk urban hromada, one of the hromadas of Ukraine. Population is 5,300 (2022 estimate).

== Name ==
The name "Shumske" was officially used starting in 1944 when Shumske lost its city status but became the center of a newly formed district due to the division of the former Kremenets County in Volyn Voivodeship of Poland. On September 17, 1939, as part of Western Ukraine, Shumske was annexed by the Soviet Union's forces following the Molotov-Ribbentrop Pact.

The name "Shumske" never took hold, and people continued to use the ancient name "Shumsk," which was restored by the Verkhovna Rada of Ukraine in 1999 in honor of Shumske's 850th anniversary.

== Geography ==
Shumsk is located upon the Viliya river in the southern part of historical Volhynia. It lies on a distance of around 100 kilometers from the regional capitals of Rivne and Ternopil.

== History ==
Archaeological finds from the Roman and Early Slavic periods have been made in the area of Shumsk. The town was first mentioned in 1149 as a fortified outpost. For some time, Shumsk served as the centre of an appanage principality, but declined as a result of Tatar raids during the 13th century.

In the 19th century Shumsk belonged to Kremenets povit. During the mid-19th century a Roman Catholic Church of Immaculate Conception was established.

During the 1940s units of the Ukrainian Insurgent Army were active in the forests around Shumsk.

Under the Soviet rule after 1945 the Catholic church was closed down and used as a warehouse and a pigsty, finally being demolished in April 1985. As of 1984, Shumsk had a population of around 4,500 inhabitants.

Between 1995 and 2005 the local church was rebuilt and returned to the Catholic community.

Until 18 July 2020, Shumsk was the administrative center of Shumsk Raion. The raion was abolished in July 2020 as part of the administrative reform of Ukraine, which reduced the number of raions of Ternopil Oblast to three. The area of Shumsk Raion was merged into Kremenets Raion.

=== Jewish history ===
Before the Second World War a major part of Shumsk's population consisted of Jews. After the arrival of Nazis, Jewish inhabitants were relocated to a ghetto, which was liquidated in July 1942, resulting in the deaths of up to 2,500 people. Some Jews managed to escape thanks to the help of locals, including at least one officer of the auxiliary police.

== Gallery ==
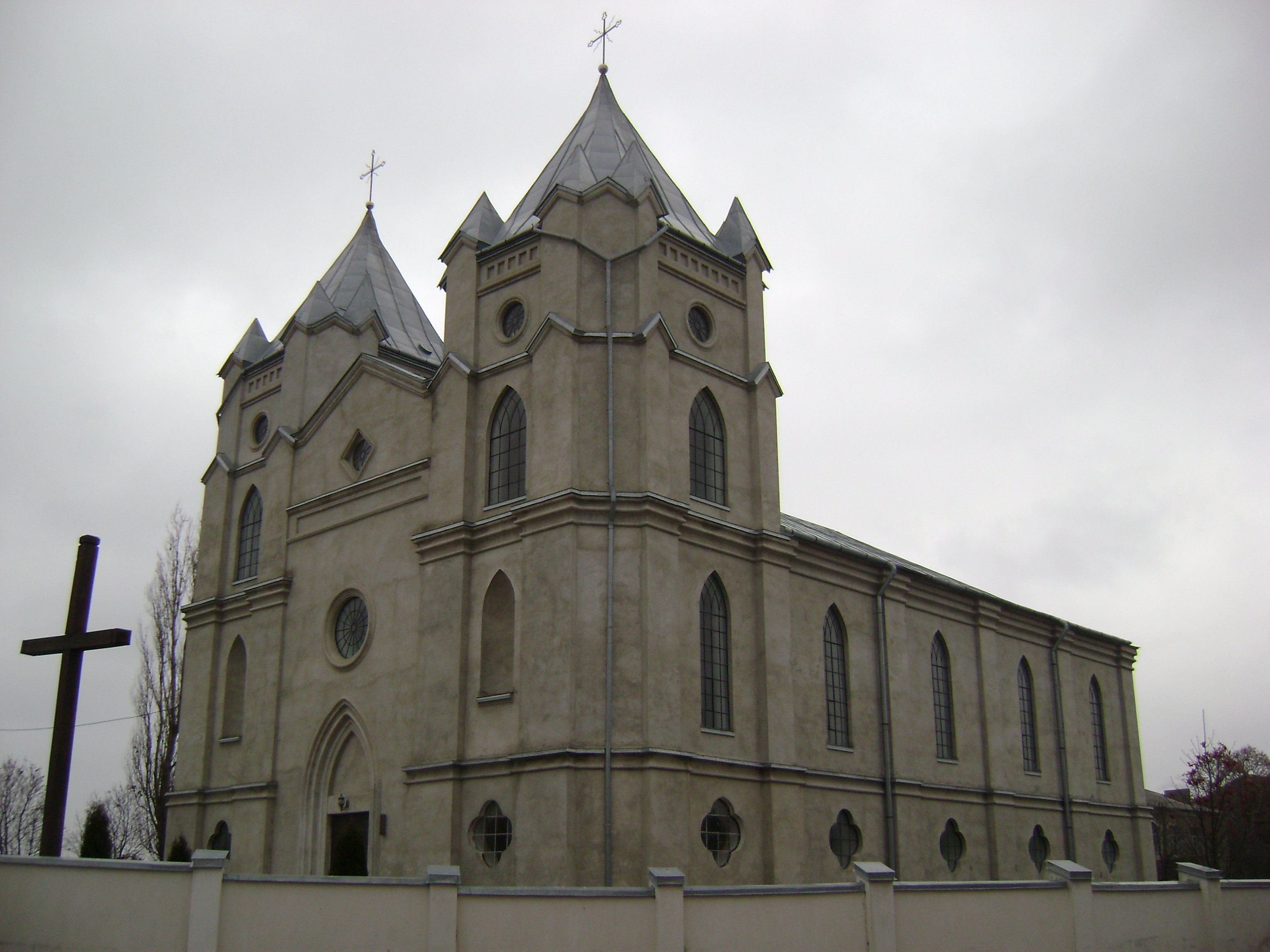
Church of the Immaculate Conception

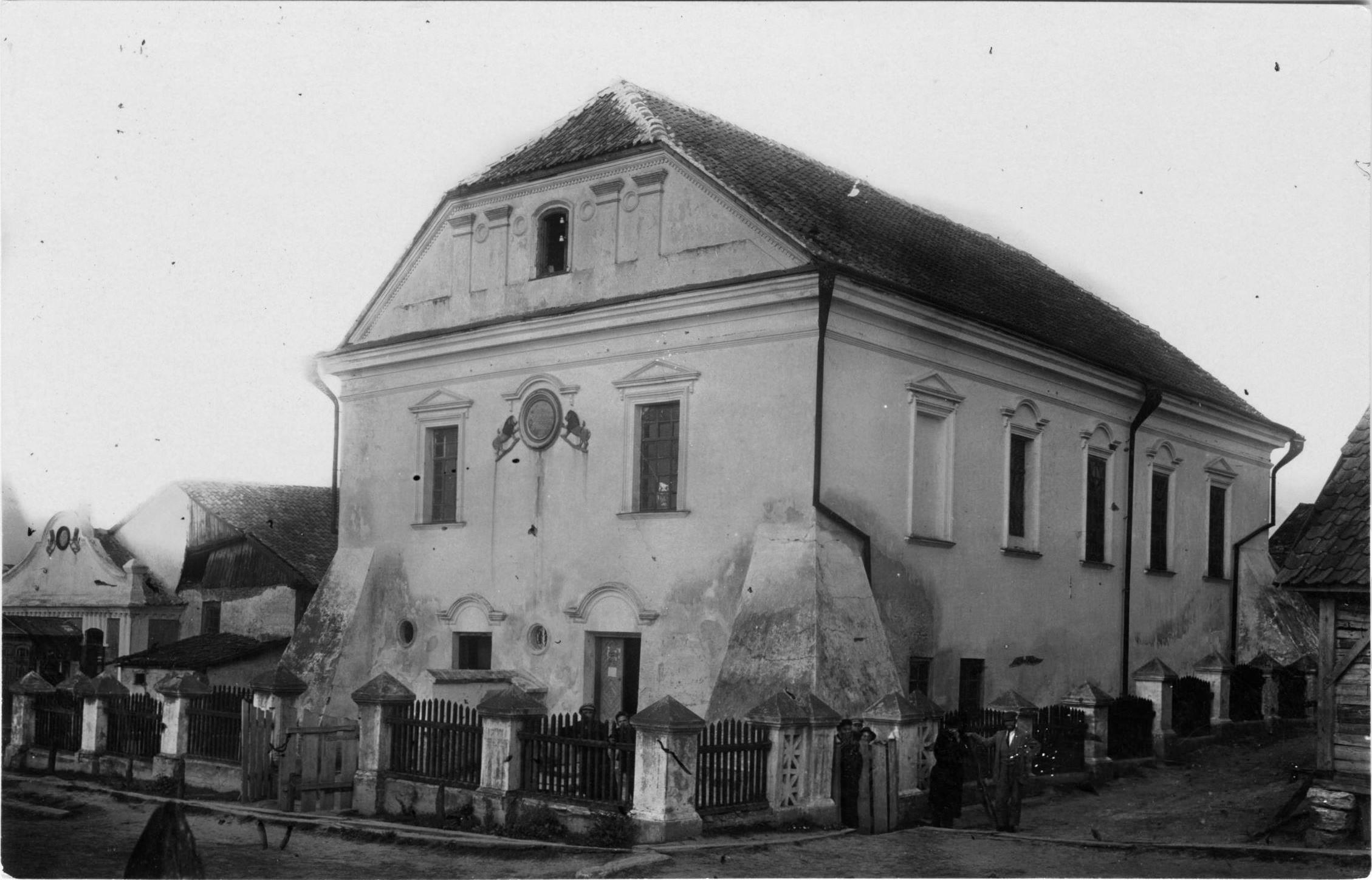
Shumsk synagogue in 1928

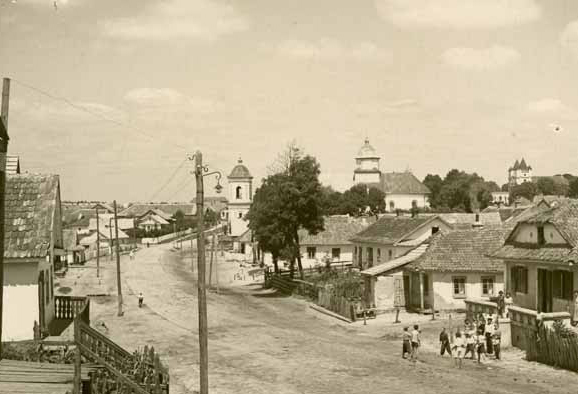
Skyline of Shumsk in 1938

== Notable people ==
- Konstantin Igelström (1799–1851), Russian noble and Decembrist
- Jan Savitt (1907–1948), American bandleader
- Michał Kazimierz "Rybeńko" Radziwiłł (1702–1762), Polish-Lithuanian noble, owner of Shumsk.
- Nikolay Soltys (1974–2002), Ukrainian (with American refugee status) family annihilator and former fugitive on the FBI Ten Most Wanted Fugitives list
