= Kärevere, Tartu County =

Village in Estonia

Coordinates: 58°25′50″N 26°29′03″E

Kärevere
- Village
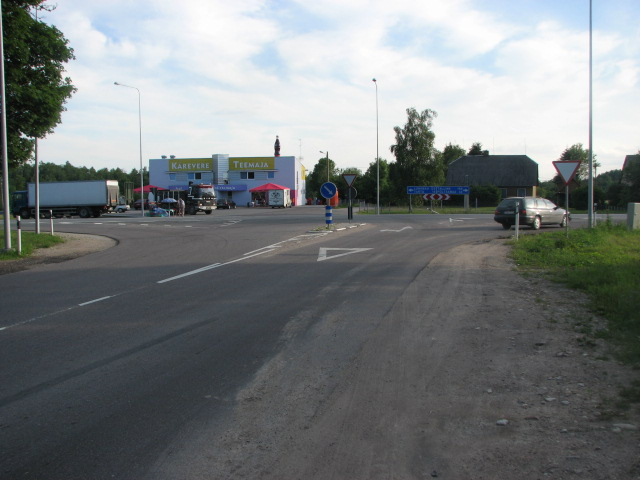
- Interactive map of Kärevere
- Country: Estonia
- County: Tartu County
- Parish: Tartu Parish
- Time zone: UTC+2 (EET)
  - Summer (DST): UTC+3 (EEST)

Kärevere is a village in Tartu Parish, Tartu County in eastern Estonia. Prior to the 2017 administrative reform in Estonia of local governments, it was located in Laeva Parish.
