= Dzelzava Manor =

Manor house in Latvia

Coordinates: 57.0003°N 26.4336°E

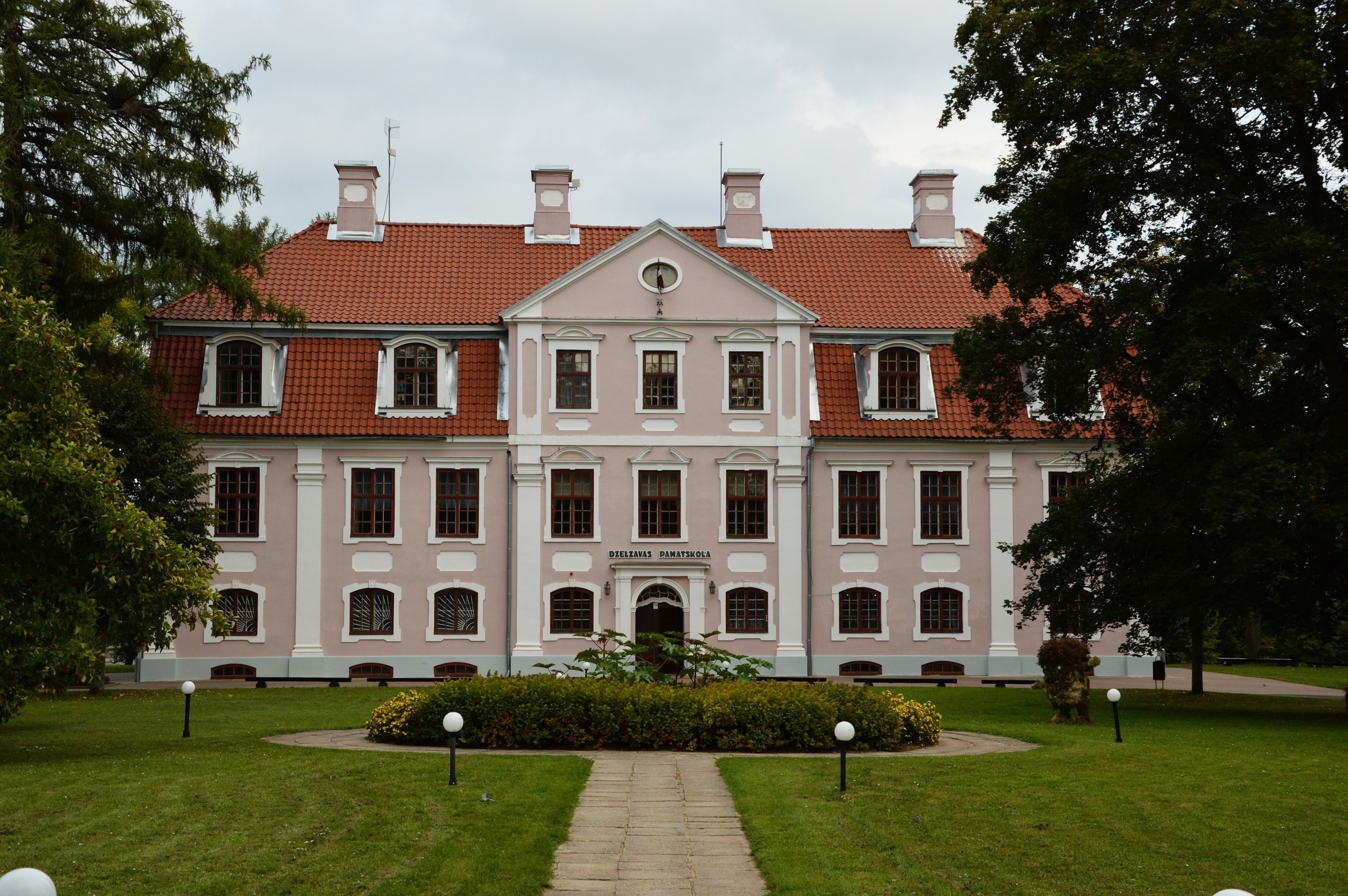
- Interactive map of the Dzelzava Manor area

General information
- Architectural style: Baroque
- Location: Dzelzava Parish, Madona Municipality, Latvia
- Completed: 1767
- Client: Otto Johan von Transehe

Dzelzava Manor (Latvian: Dzelzavas muižas pils, German: Selsau) is a manor house in Dzelzava Parish, Madona Municipality in the Vidzeme region of Latvia. It was built in Baroque style and completed in 1767. Damaged by fire in 1905, it was fully restored to its original appearance in 1908 under the guidance of architect Vilhelms Bokslafs. The building currently houses the Dzelzava primary school.

== See also ==
- List of palaces and manor houses in Latvia
