= Dzelzava Parish =

Parish of Latvia

- parish of Latvia
- Coat of arms

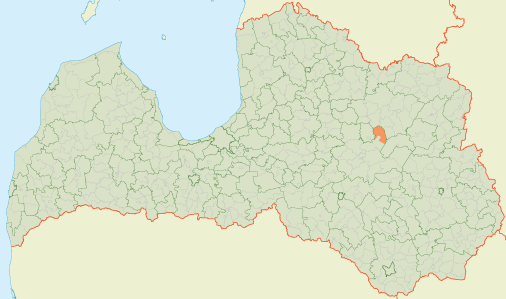
- 56°59′37″N 26°28′27″E
- Country: Latvia

Area
  - Total: 122.90 km^{2} (47.45 sq mi)
  - Land: 120.49 km^{2} (46.52 sq mi)
  - Water: 2.41 km^{2} (0.93 sq mi)

Population (1 January 2025)
  - Total: 1,000
  - Density: 8.3/km^{2} (21/sq mi)
- Website: www.dzelzava.lv

Dzelzava Parish (Latvian: Dzelzavas pagasts) is an administrative unit of Madona Municipality in the Vidzeme region of Latvia.

== Gallery ==
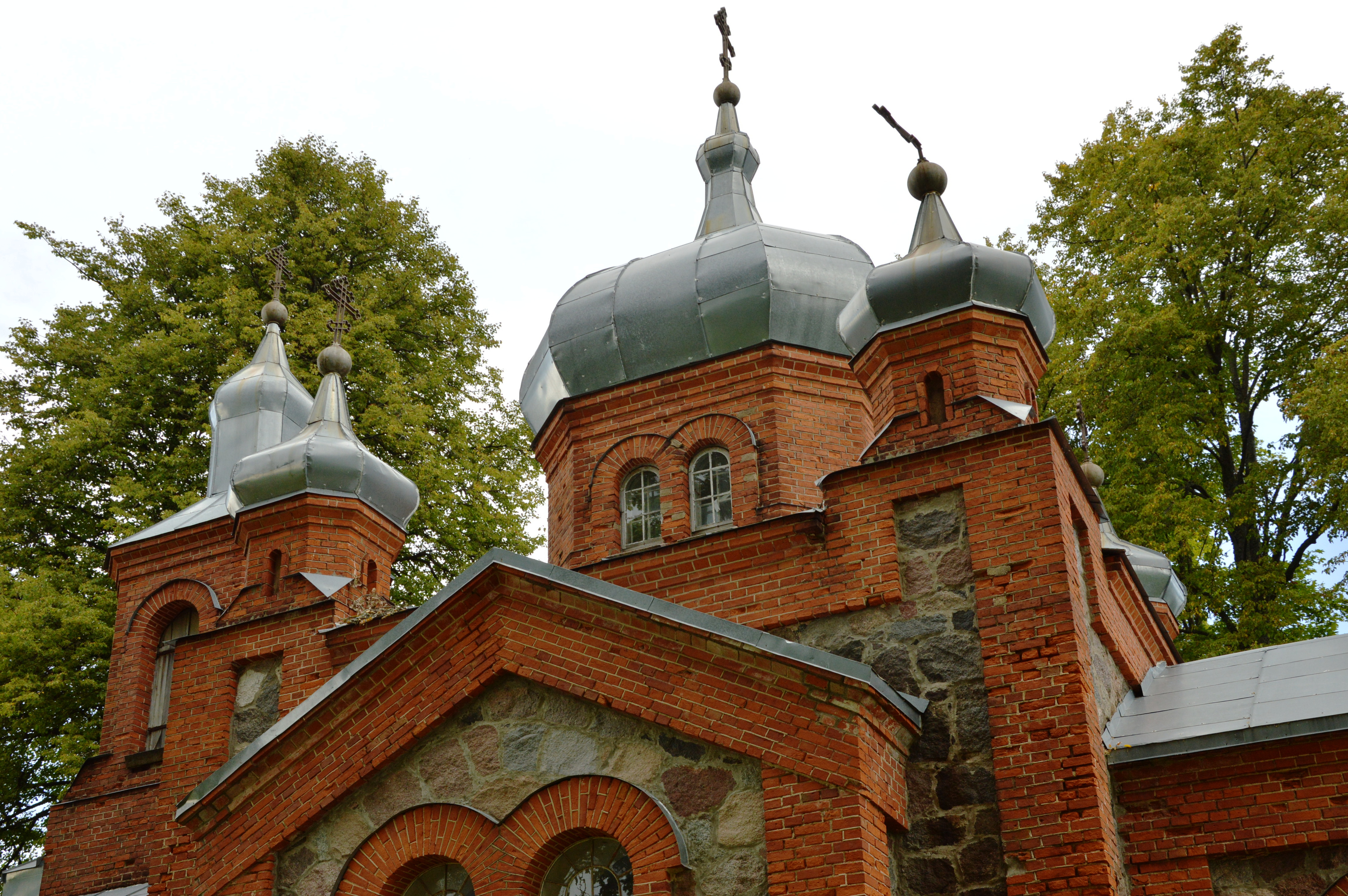
Bučauska orthodox church

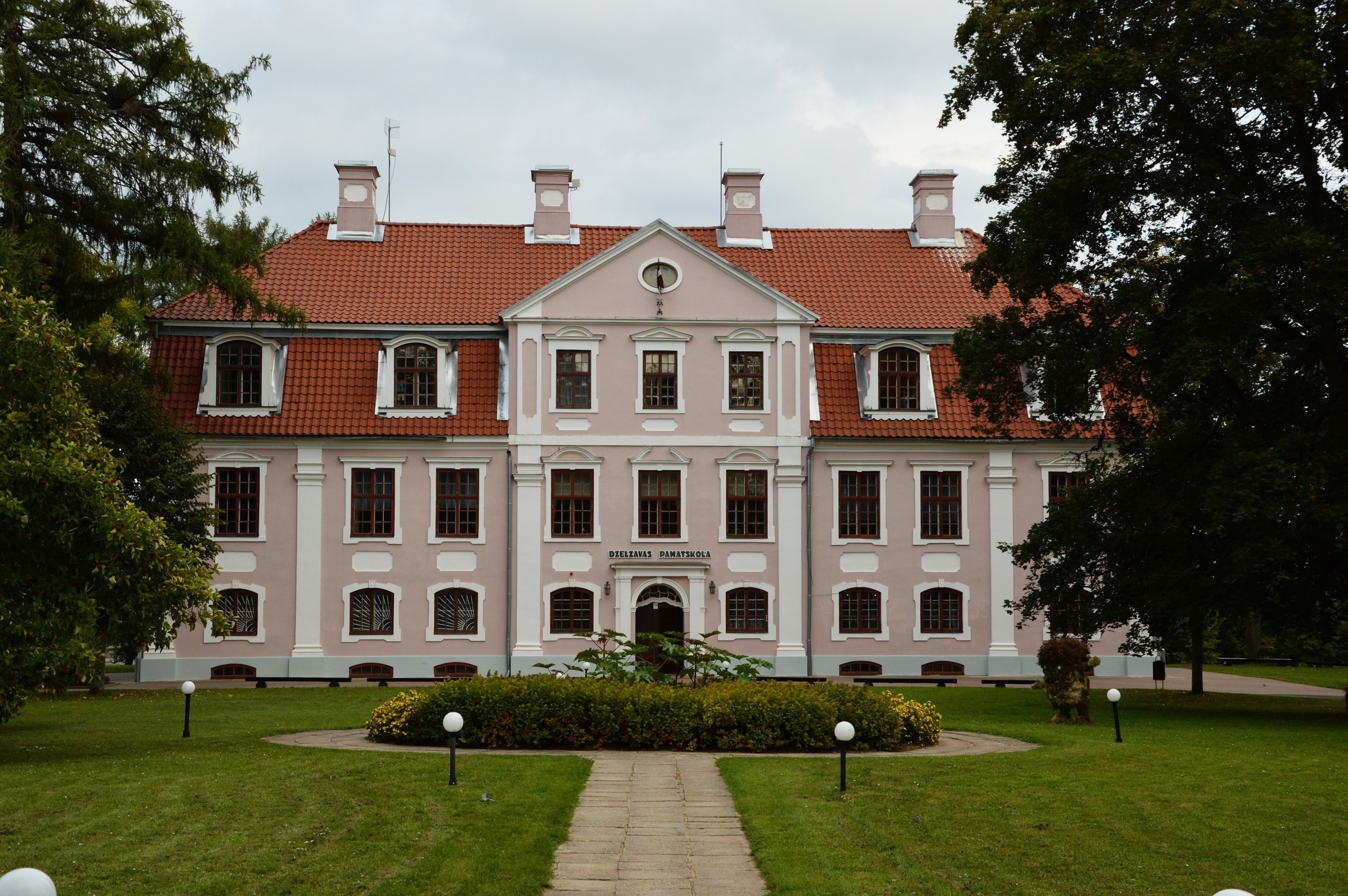
Dzelzava Manor

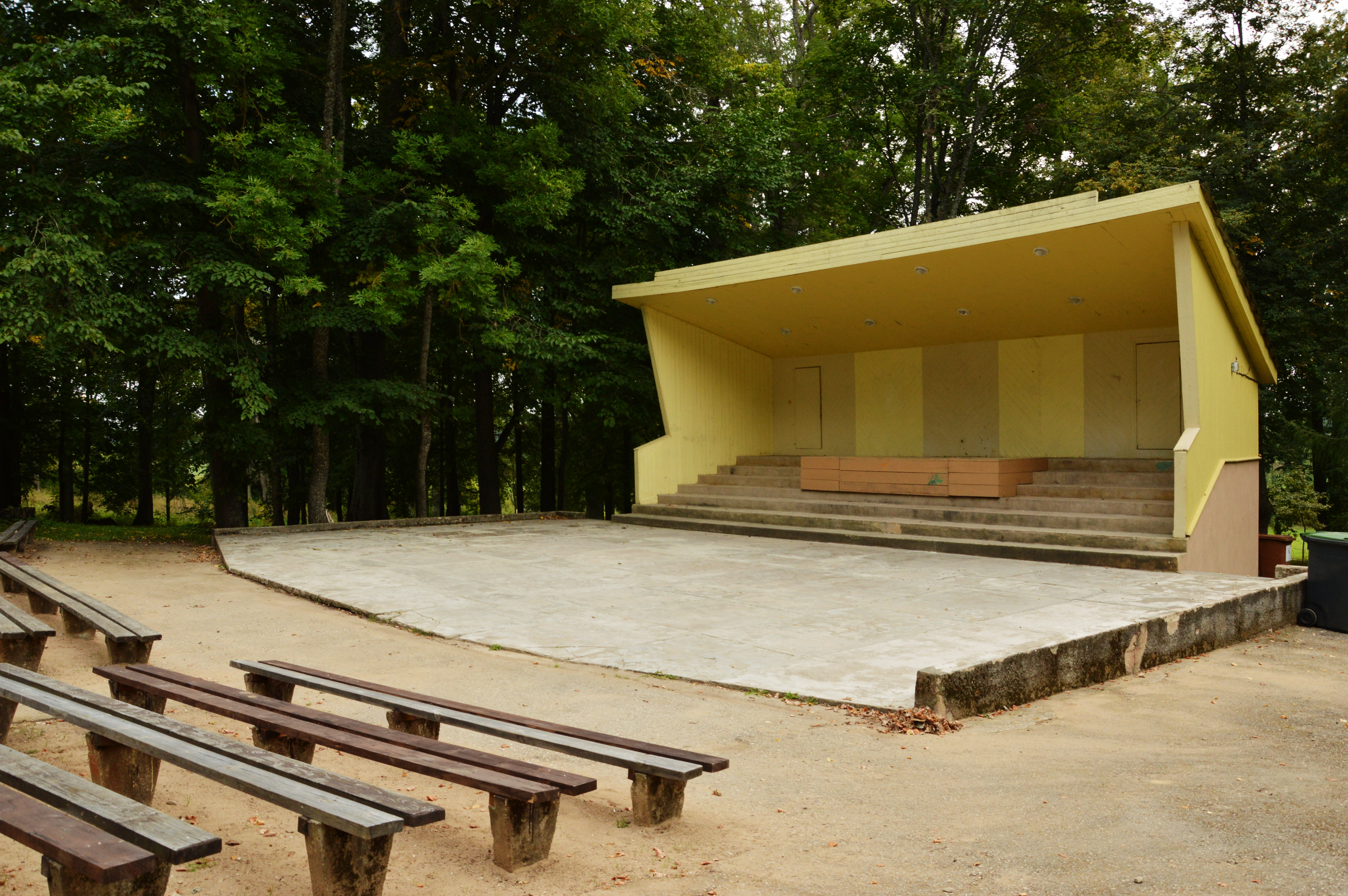
Dzelzava song stage

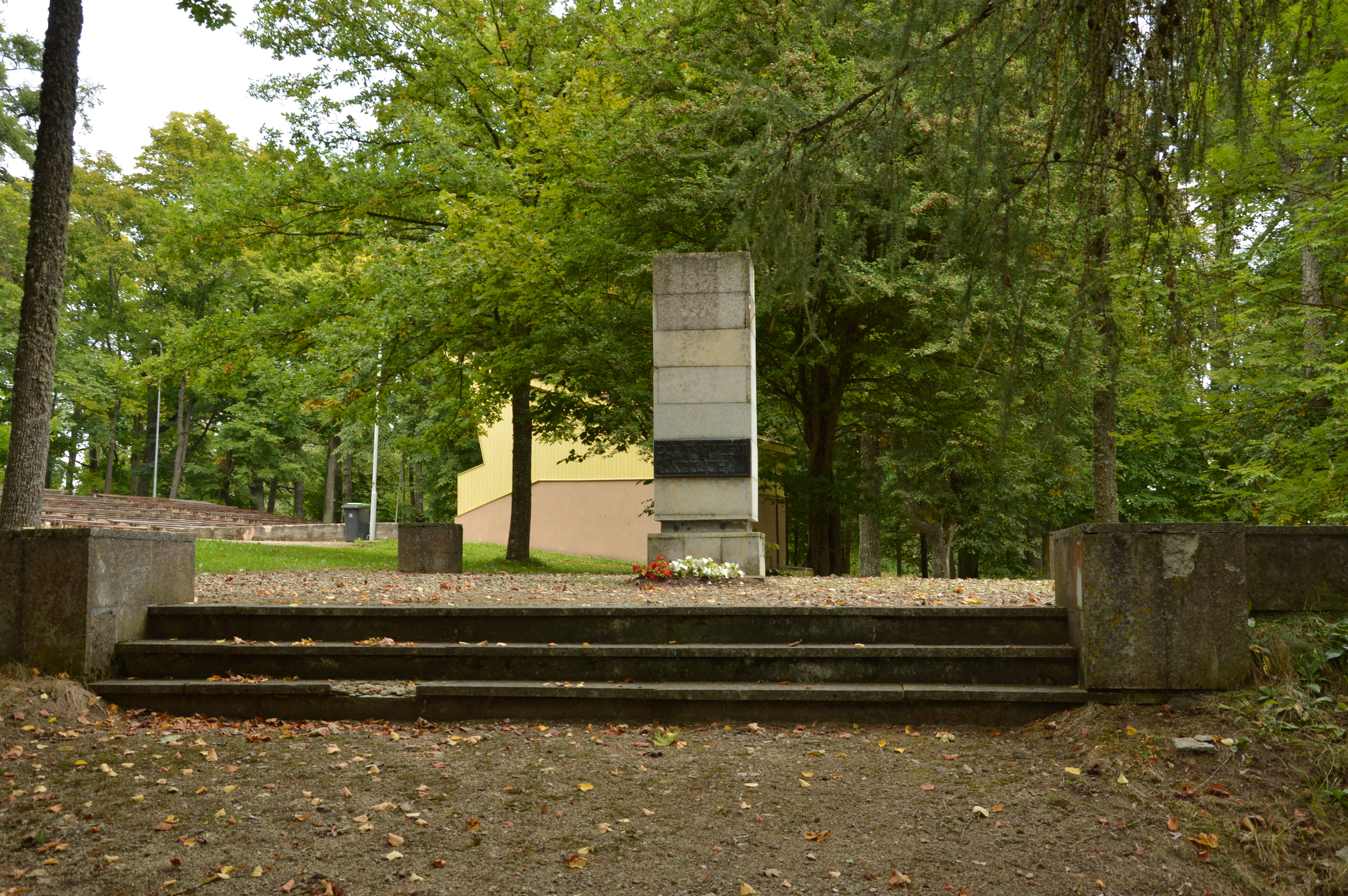
Monument
