= Laeva Parish =

Former municipality of Estonia

Coordinates: 58°29′31″N 26°21′42″E

Laeva Parish Laeva vald
- Former municipality of Estonia
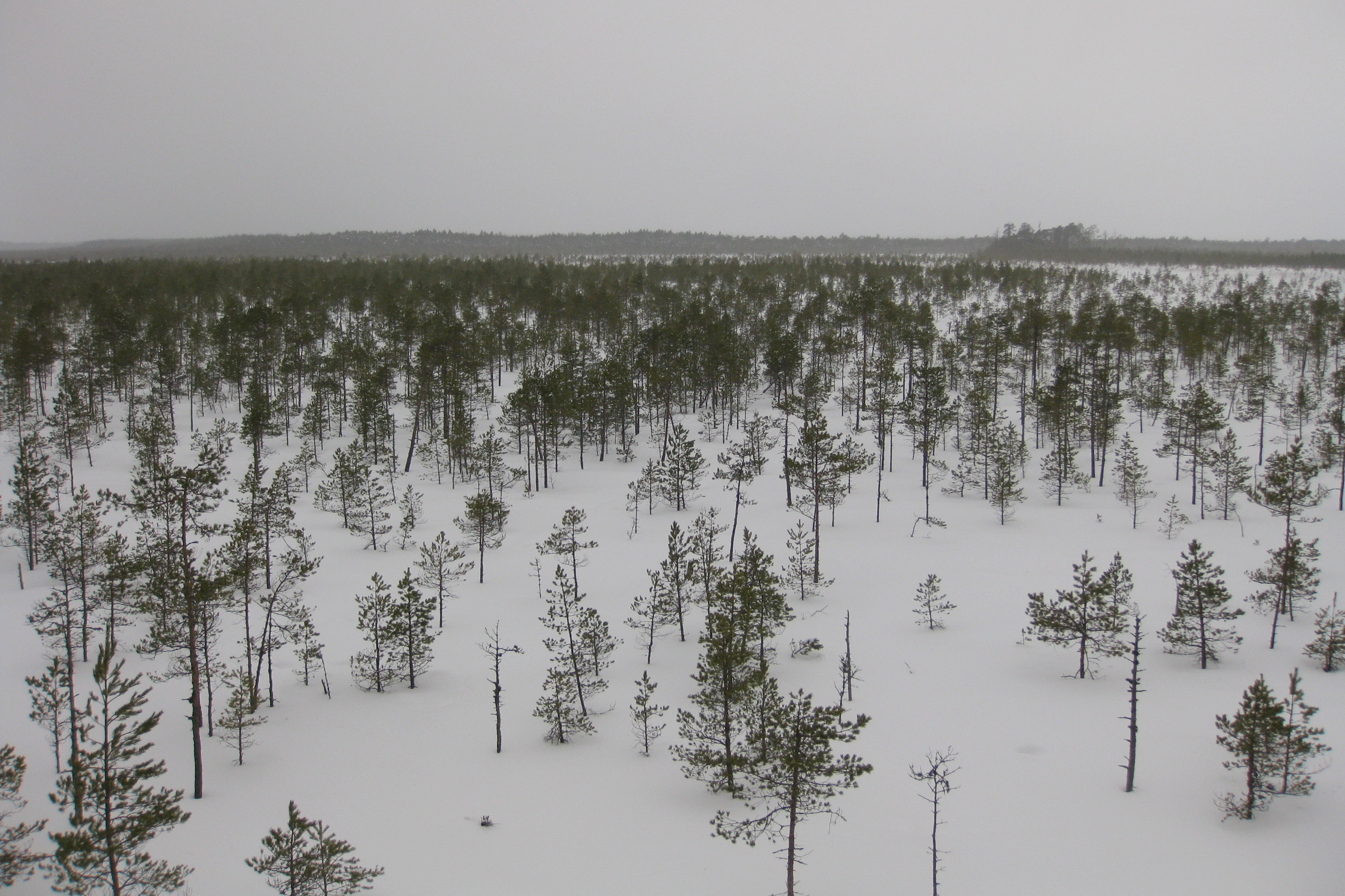

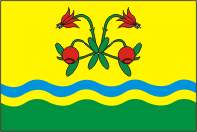
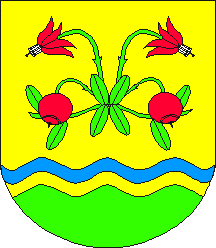
- Flag Coat of arms

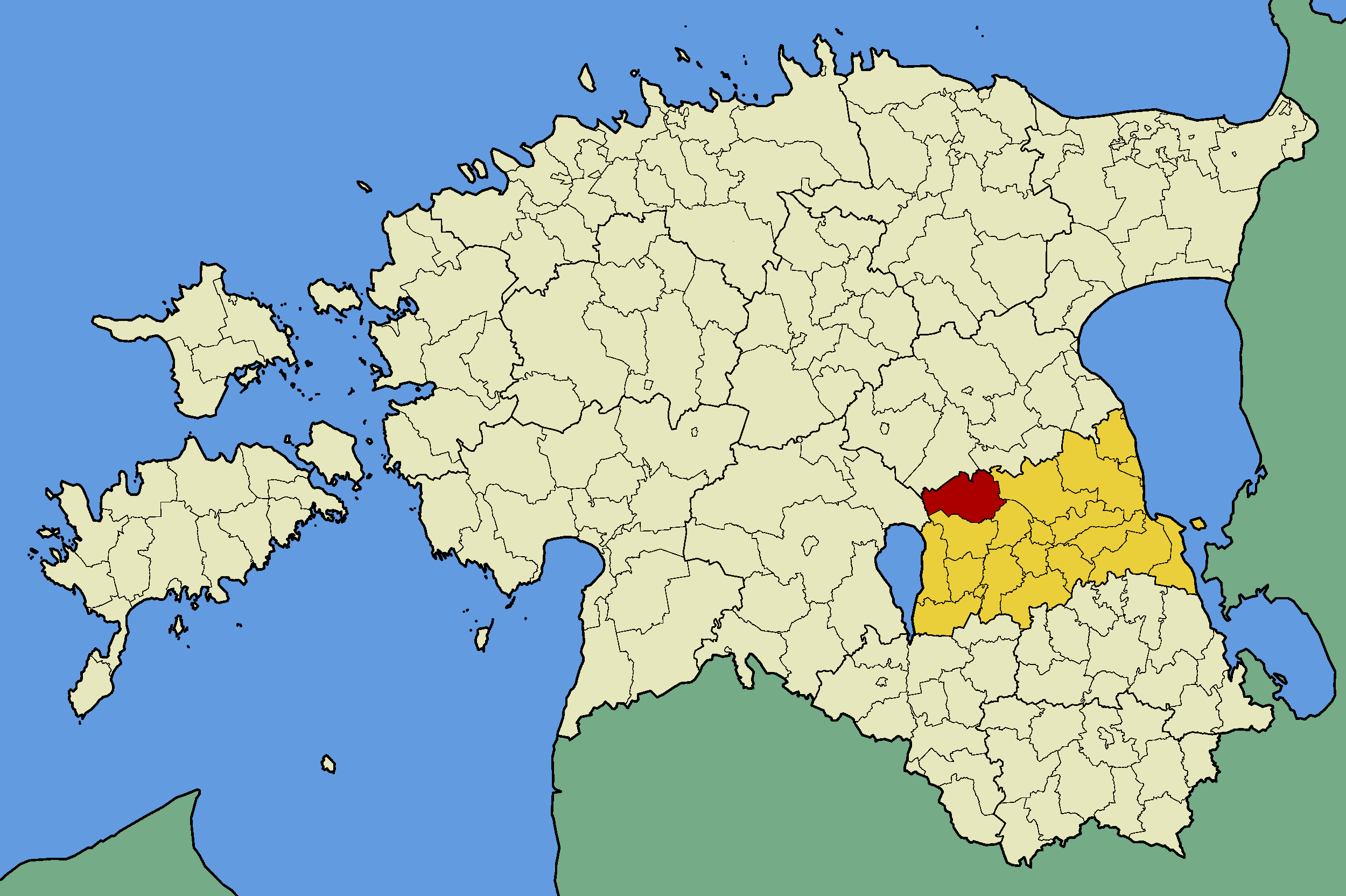
- Laeva Parish within Tartu County.
- Country: Estonia
- County: Tartu County
- Administrative centre: Laeva
- Website: www.laeva.ee

Laeva Parish was a rural municipality in Tartu County, Estonia. Since 2017, it has been a part of the larger Tartu Parish.

== Settlements ==
Villages

Kämara - Kärevere - Laeva - Siniküla - Väänikvere - Valmaotsa

== Gallery ==
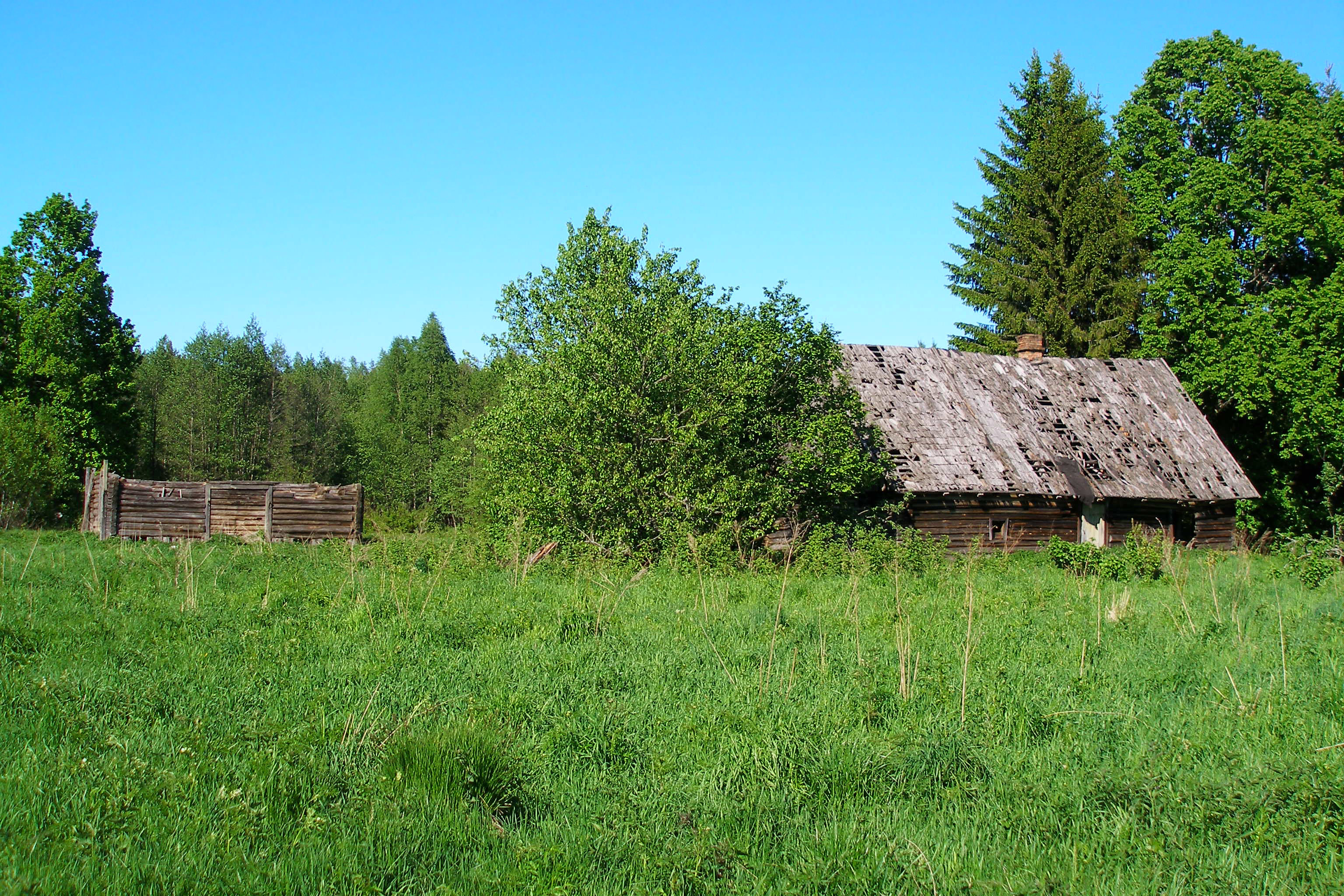
Derelict forest ranger farm on the Alam-Pedja Nature Reserve in Valmaotsa.
