= Laeva =

Village in Estonia

Coordinates: 58°29′13″N 26°22′54″E

- Village
- Interactive map of Laeva
- Country: Estonia
- County: Tartu County
- Parish: Tartu Parish
- Time zone: UTC+2 (EET)
  - Summer (DST): UTC+3 (EEST)

Laeva (German: Laiwa) is a village in Tartu Parish, Tartu County, Estonia. Prior to 2017, it was administrative centre of Laeva Parish.
