= Veriora Parish =

Former municipality of Estonia

Coordinates: 58°0′29″N 27°21′1″E

Veriora Parish Veriora vald
- Former municipality of Estonia
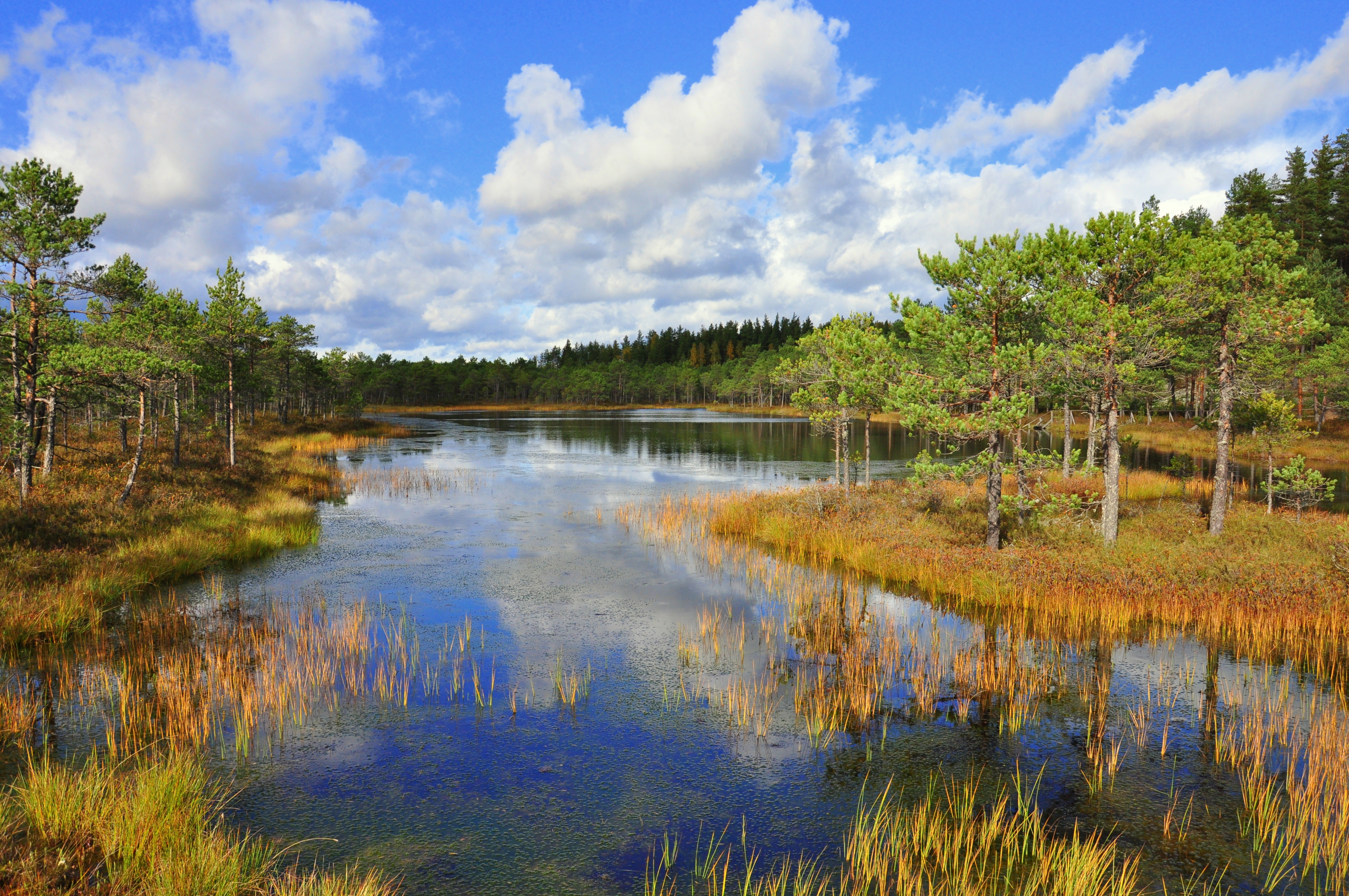
- Meenikunno bog

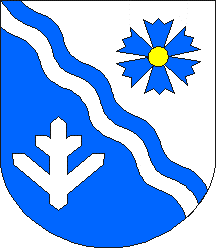
- Flag Coat of arms

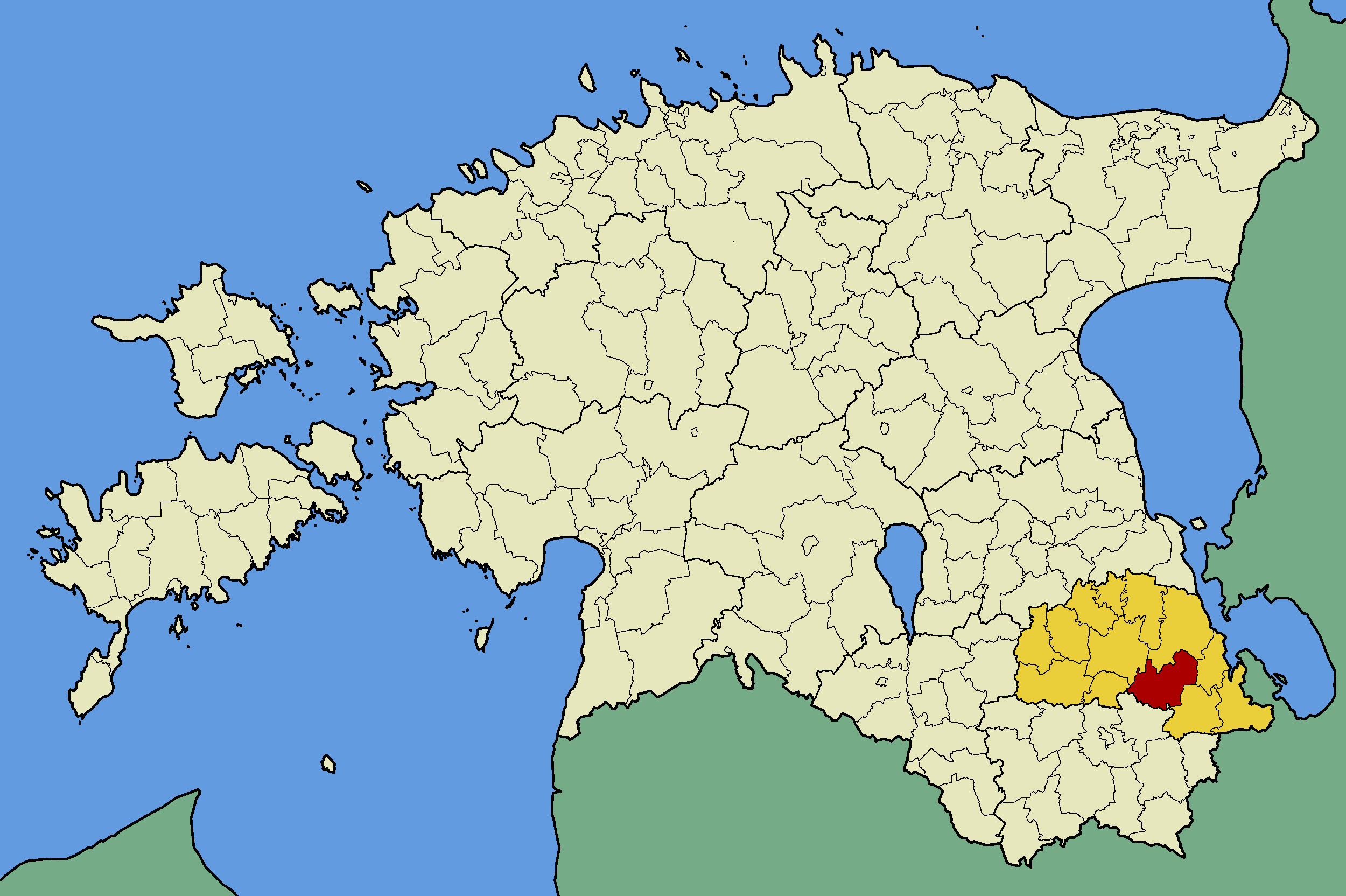
- Veriora Parish within Põlva County
- Country: Estonia
- County: Põlva
- Administrative centre: Veriora

Area
  - Total: 200.37 km^{2} (77.36 sq mi)

Population (01.01.2017)
  - Total: 1,350
  - Density: 6.74/km^{2} (17.5/sq mi)

Veriora Parish (Estonian: Veriora vald) was a rural municipality of Estonia, in Põlva County. It had a population of 1350 (as of 2017) and an area of 200.37 km². In 2017, Veriora Parish, Räpina Parish and Meeksi Parish were merged and a new municipality Räpina Parish was formed.

== Settlements ==
Small borough

Veriora

Villages

Haavapää - Himmiste - Jõevaara - Jõeveere - Kikka - Kirmsi - Koolma - Koolmajärve - Kullamäe - Kunksilla - Laho - Leevi - Lihtensteini - Männisalu - Mõtsavaara - Nohipalo - Pahtpää - Sarvemäe - Soohara - Süvahavva - Timo - Väike-Veerksu - Vändra - Vareste - Verioramõisa - Viira - Viluste - Vinso - Võika
