= Leevaku Reservoir =

Lake in Estonia

- Leevaku paisjärv (Estonian)
- Location within Estonia
- Location: Põlva County, Estonia
- Coordinates: 58°5′6.43″N 27°20′14.16″E
- Primary inflows: Võhandu
- Primary outflows: Võhandu
- Catchment area: 1,024 square kilometers (395 sq mi)
- Basin countries: Estonia
- Max. length: 2,850 meters (9,350 ft)
- Max. width: 280 meters (920 ft)
- Surface area: 46.1 hectares (114 acres)
- Shore length^{1}: 8,230 meters (27,000 ft)
- Surface elevation: 39.8 meters (131 ft)
- ^{1} Shore length is not a well-defined measure.

The Leevaku Reservoir (Estonian: Leevaku paisjärv, also known as Leevaku veehoidla) is a lake in Estonia. It is located in the village of Jaanikeste in Räpina Parish, Põlva County.

== Physical description ==
The lake has an area of 46.1 hectares (114 acres). It is 2,850 meters (9,350 ft) long, and its shoreline measures 8,230 meters (27,000 ft).

== See also ==
- List of lakes of Estonia
