= Jaan Mälberg =

Estonian politician

Jaan Mälberg (13 May 1888 Toolamaa Parish, Kreis Werro – 9 March 1947 Tartu) was an Estonian farmer and politician. He was born it in Leevaku. Mälberg was a member of III Riigikogu from 11 November 1926 until 14 June 1929. Malberg was part of The Räpina farmers' convention. He replaced Jüri Jaakson. Mälberg is buried at the Räpina cemetery.
