= Mädajõgi =

River in Estonia

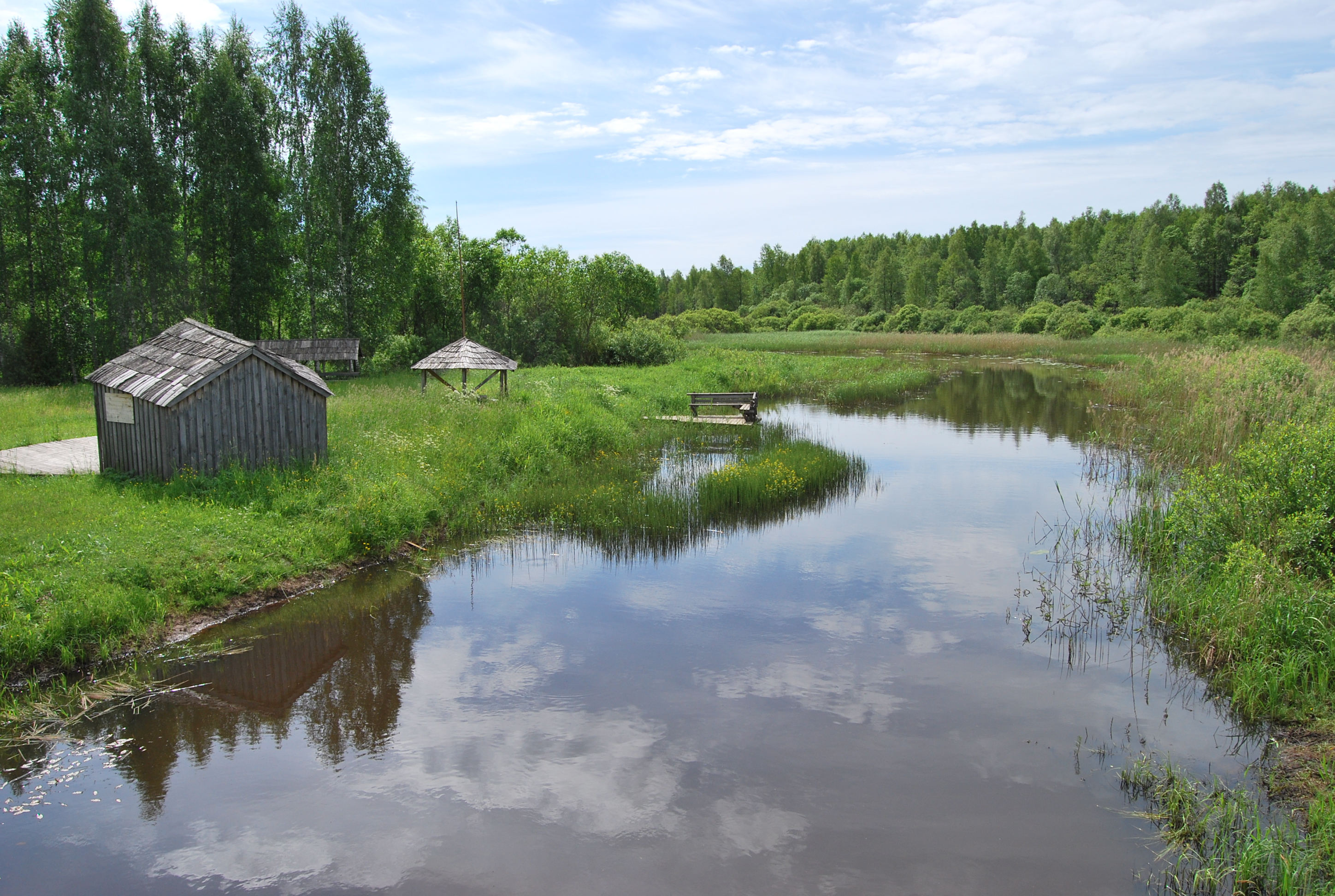

Location
- Country: Estonia

Physical characteristics
- Mouth: Võhandu River
  - coordinates: 58°03′55″N 27°31′10″E
- Length: 31 km (19 mi)
- Basin size: 245.4 km^{2} (94.7 sq mi)

The Mädajõgi is a river in Põlva and Võru counties, Estonia. The river is 31 km long, and its basin size is 245.4 km^{2}. It discharges into the Võhandu River.
