= Kullamäe =

Kullamäe may refer to:

- Kullamäe, Harju County
- Kullamäe, Põlva County
- Gert Kullamäe
