= Valgesoo Nature Reserve =

Protected area in Estonia

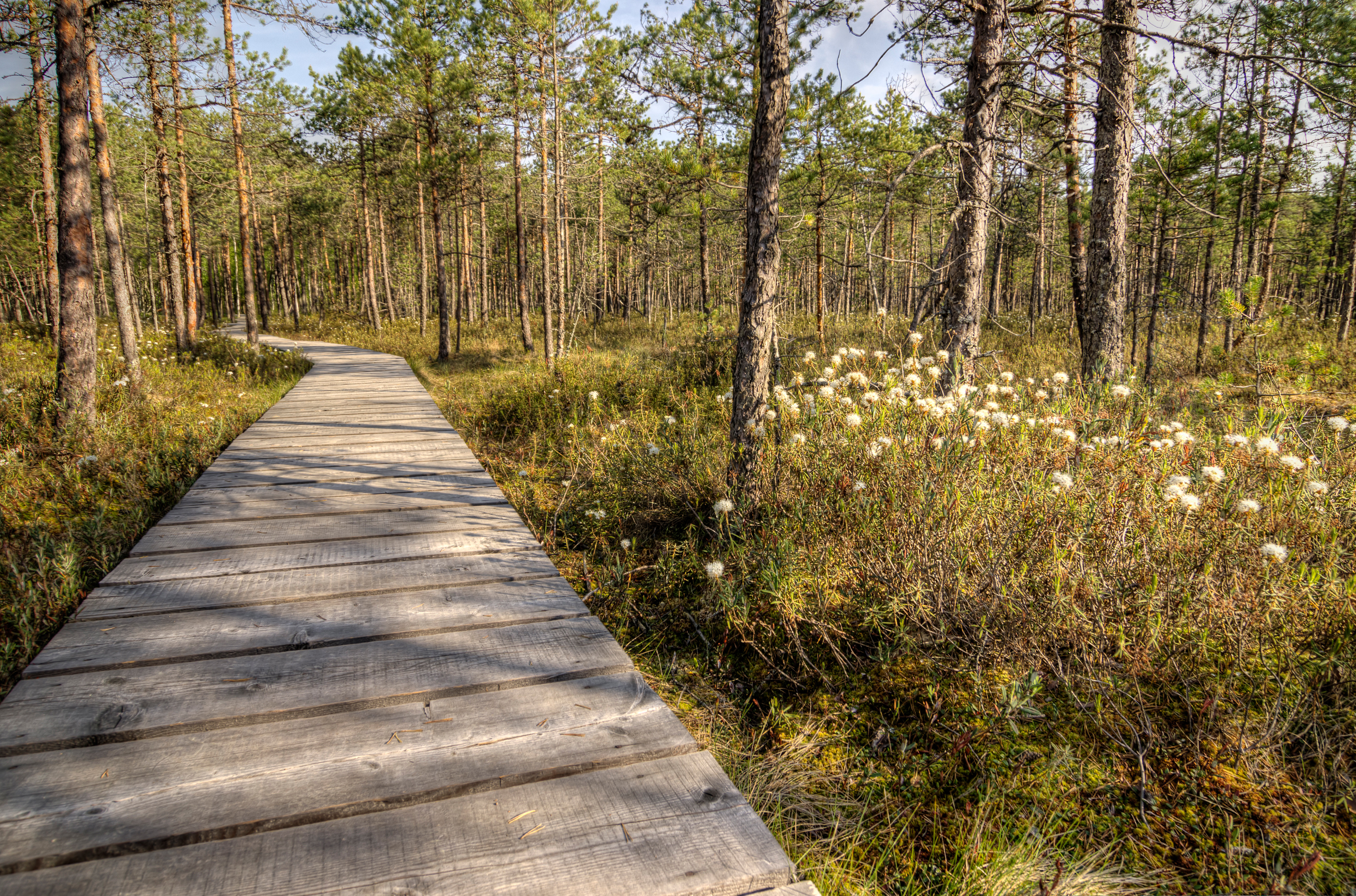

- Location within Estonia
- Location: Estonia
- Coordinates: 58°09′N 27°04′E
- Area: 343 ha (850 acres)
- Established: 1981 (2016)

Valgesoo Nature Reserve is a nature reserve which is located in Põlva County, Estonia.

The area of the nature reserve is 343 ha.

The protected area was founded in 1981 to protect Valgesoo Wetland. In 2001 the protected area was designated to the landscape conservation area. In 2016 it was designated to the nature reserve.
