= Jõepera, Põlva County =

Village in Estonia

Coordinates: 58°16′05″N 27°26′06″E

Jõepera
- Village
- Interactive map of Jõepera
- Country: Estonia
- County: Põlva County
- Parish: Räpina Parish
- Time zone: UTC+2 (EET)
  - Summer (DST): UTC+3 (EEST)

Jõepera is a village in Räpina Parish, Põlva County in eastern Estonia.
