= Ristipalo =

Village in Estonia

- Village
- Location within Estonia
- Coordinates: 58°05′N 27°29′E
- Country: Estonia
- County: Põlva County
- Parish: Räpina Parish
- Time zone: UTC+2 (EET)
  - Summer (DST): UTC+3 (EEST)

Ristipalo is a village in Räpina Parish, Põlva County in southeastern Estonia.
