= Kõnnu, Põlva County =

Village in Estonia

Coordinates: 58°10′42″N 27°23′55″E

Kõnnu
- Village
- Interactive map of Kõnnu
- Country: Estonia
- County: Põlva County
- Parish: Räpina Parish
- Time zone: UTC+2 (EET)
  - Summer (DST): UTC+3 (EEST)

Kõnnu is a village in Räpina Parish, Põlva County in southeastern Estonia.
