= Naha, Estonia =

Village in Estonia

Coordinates: 58°10′46″N 27°26′32″E

Naha
- Village
- Interactive map of Naha
- Country: Estonia
- County: Põlva County
- Parish: Räpina Parish
- Time zone: UTC+2 (EET)
  - Summer (DST): UTC+3 (EEST)

Naha is a village in Räpina Parish, Põlva County in southeastern Estonia.
