= Saareküla =

Saareküla may refer to several places in Estonia:

- Saareküla, Põlva County, village in Estonia
- Saareküla, Saare County, village in Estonia
- Saareküla, Viljandi County, village in Estonia
