= Meenikunno Nature Reserve =

Protected area in Estonia

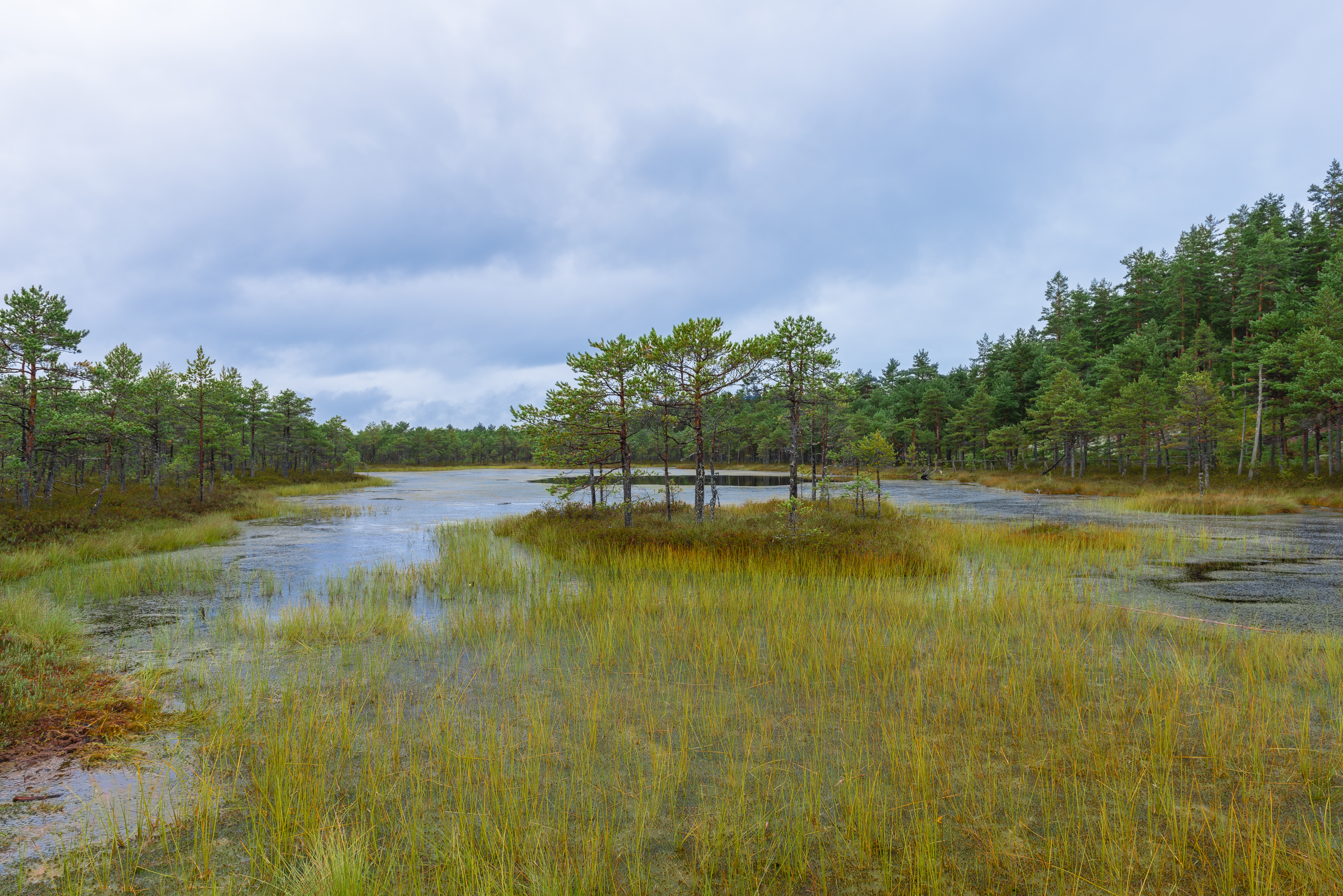

- Location within Estonia
- Location: Estonia
- Coordinates: 57°56′30″N 27°19′00″E
- Area: 3,028 ha (7,480 acres)
- Established: 1981 (2015)

Meenikunno Nature Reserve is a nature reserve which is located on the border of Põlva County and Võru County in Estonia.

The area of the nature reserve is 3028 ha.

The protected area was founded in 1981 on the basis of Meenikunno Wetland Conservation Area. Before 2015, there existed Meenikunno Landscape Conservation Area.

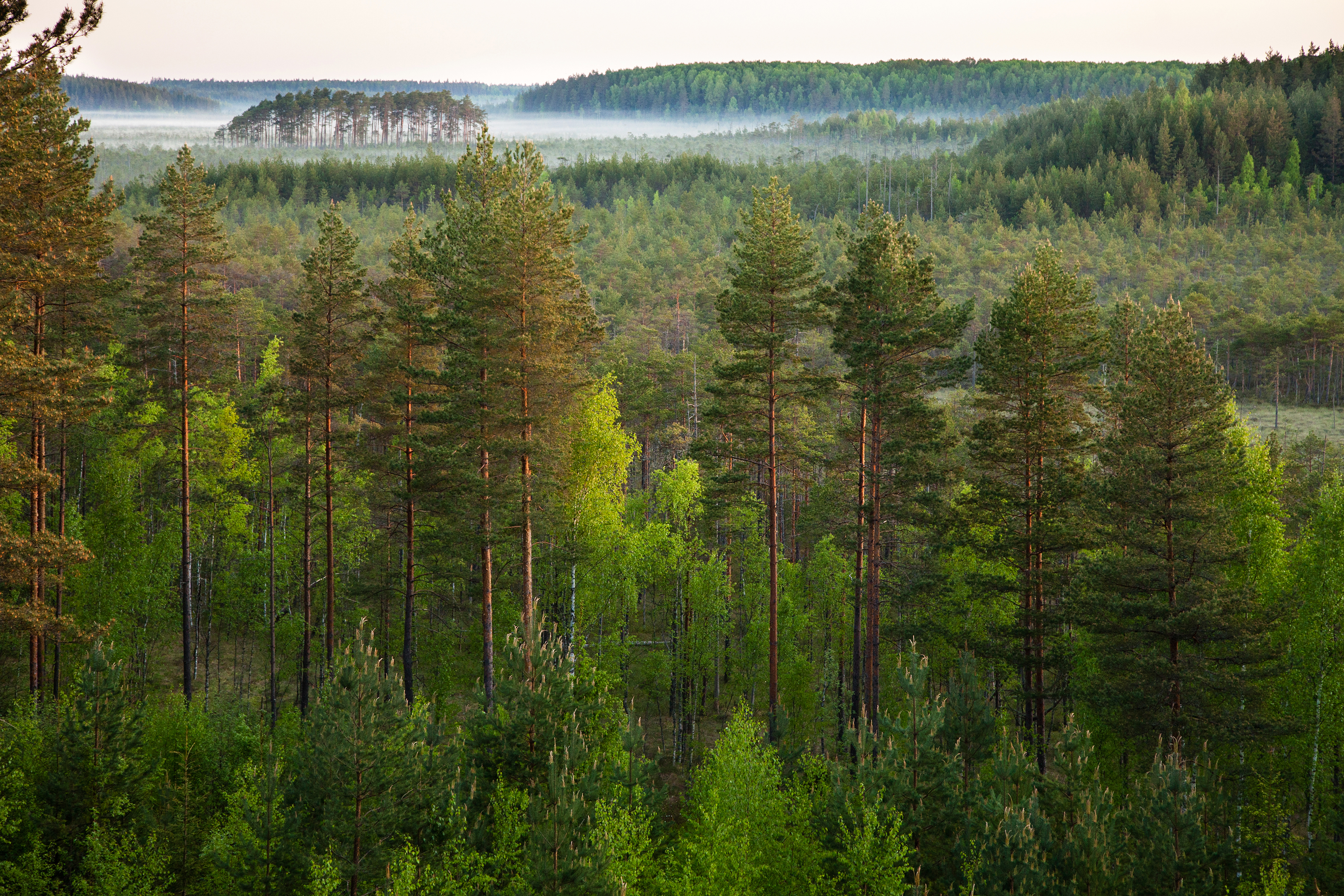
Forest in Meenikunno Nature Park
