= Pedaspää =

Village in Estonia

- Village
- Location within Estonia
- Coordinates: 58.3944°N 27.3453°E
- Country: Estonia
- County: Põlva County
- Parish: Räpina Parish
- Time zone: UTC+2 (EET)
  - Summer (DST): UTC+3 (EEST)

Pedaspää is a village in Räpina Parish, Põlva County in Estonia.
