= Pääsna =

Village in Estonia

Coordinates: 58°01′N 27°17′E

- Village
- Interactive map of Pääsna
- Country: Estonia
- County: Põlva County
- Parish: Räpina Parish
- Time zone: UTC+2 (EET)
  - Summer (DST): UTC+3 (EEST)

Pääsna is a village in Räpina Parish, Põlva County in southeastern Estonia.
