= Pindi, Põlva County =

Village in Estonia

Coordinates: 58°01′44″N 27°18′25″E

Pindi
- Village
- Interactive map of Pindi
- Country: Estonia
- County: Põlva County
- Parish: Räpina Parish
- Time zone: UTC+2 (EET)
  - Summer (DST): UTC+3 (EEST)

Pindi is a village in Räpina Parish, Põlva County in southeastern Estonia.
