= Sillapää =

Village in Estonia

- Village
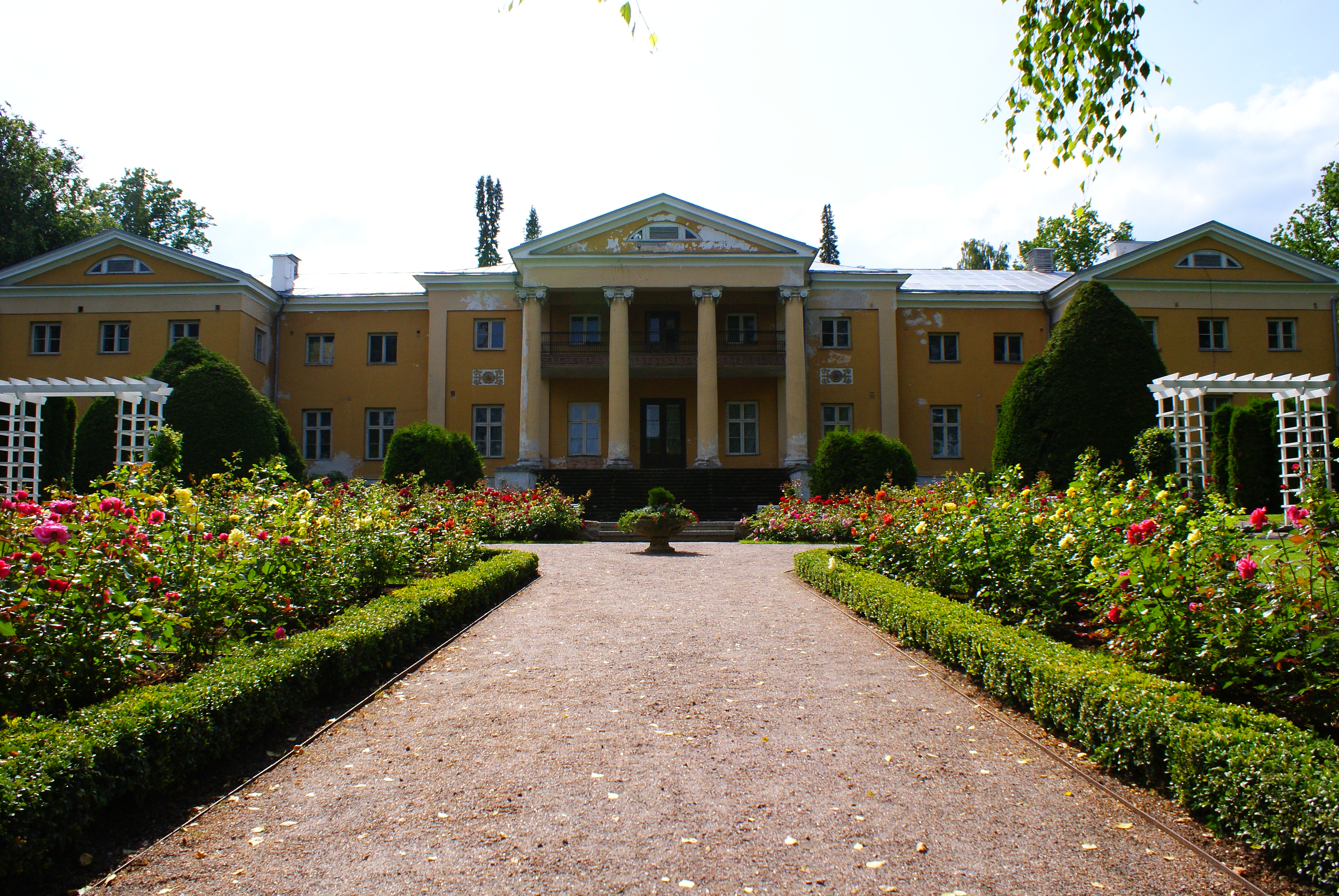
- Sillapää manor

- Location within Estonia
- Coordinates: 58°05′N 27°26′E
- Country: Estonia
- County: Põlva County
- Parish: Räpina Parish
- Time zone: UTC+2 (EET)
  - Summer (DST): UTC+3 (EEST)

Sillapää is a village in Räpina Parish, Põlva County in southeastern Estonia.

== Sillapää manor ==
Sillapää manor, sometimes referred to as Räpina manor, was founded in 1582 during the Polish time. In 1625, when the territory had been conquered by Sweden, it became the property of Bengt Oxenstierna. It was later returned to the state via one of the so-called reductions. Subsequently, it belonged to several different aristocratic families until the Estonian land reform of 1919. After that, in 1920, it became a school, and today is a gardening school and a museum. The current neoclassical building is from 1836 to 1847, built to the designs of architect R. E. von Richter. The interiors however have not been preserved. Surrounding the manor is a large park, housing over 300 different species of trees and bushes. The park was designed by well-known Riga garden designer Walter von Engelhardt in the 19th century.
