= Sülgoja =

Village in Estonia

Coordinates: 58°04′N 27°29′E

- Village
- Interactive map of Sülgoja
- Country: Estonia
- County: Põlva County
- Parish: Räpina Parish
- Time zone: UTC+2 (EET)
  - Summer (DST): UTC+3 (EEST)

Tsõõrikmäe meteorite crater
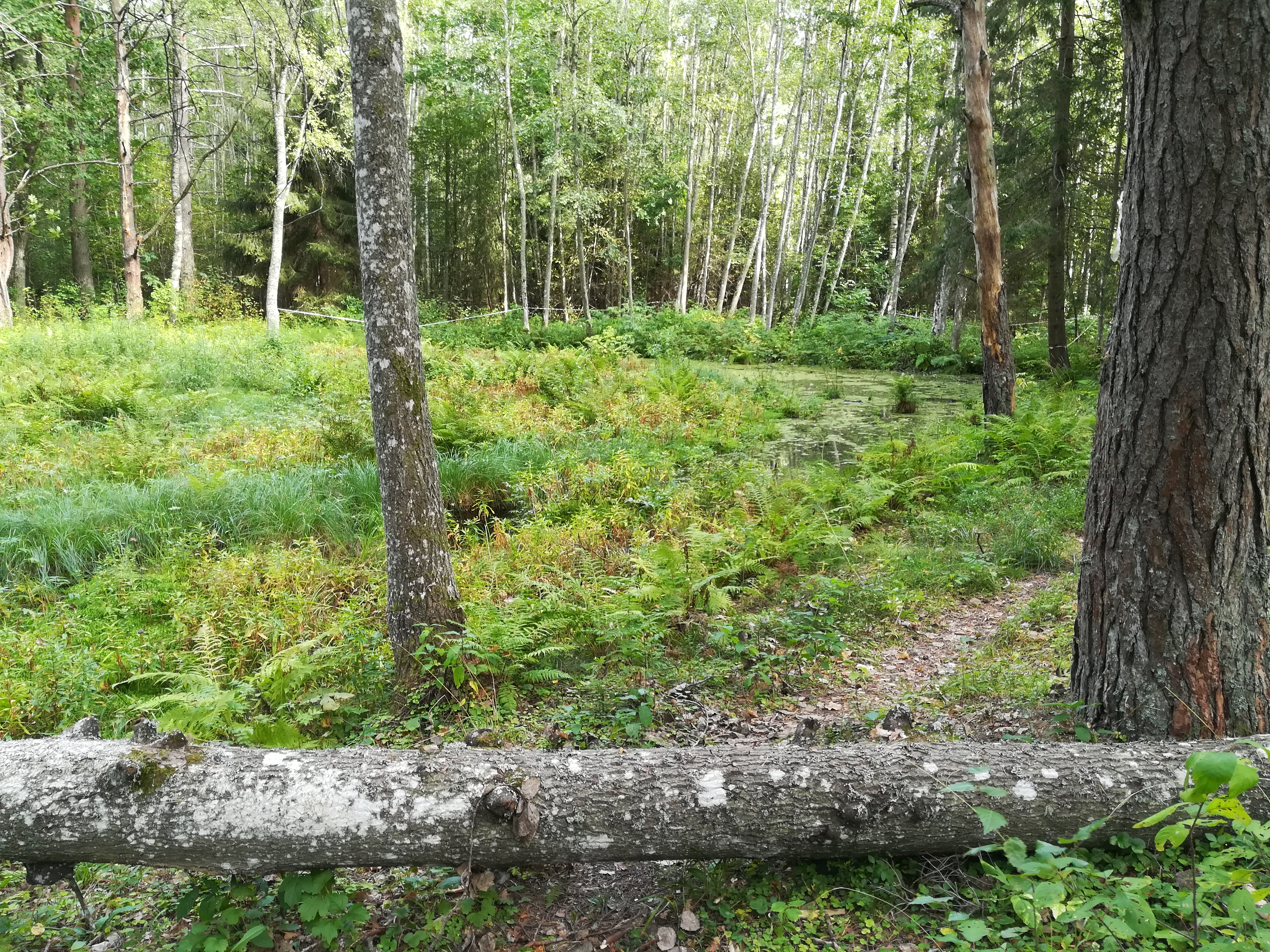
- Tsõõrikmäe meteorite crater

- Location within Estonia
- Location: Sülgoja, Põlva County, Räpina Parish, Estonia

Impact crater structure
- Diameter: 38–40 m (125–131 ft)
- Age: c. 10,000 years old

Sülgoja is a village in Räpina Parish, Põlva County in southeastern Estonia.

Tsõõrikmäe meteorite crater is located in this village. The crater is about 9.500-10.000 years old. The crater's diameter is 38–40 m.
