= Rahumäe, Põlva County =

Village in Estonia

Coordinates: 58°04′N 27°25′E

Rahumäe
- Village
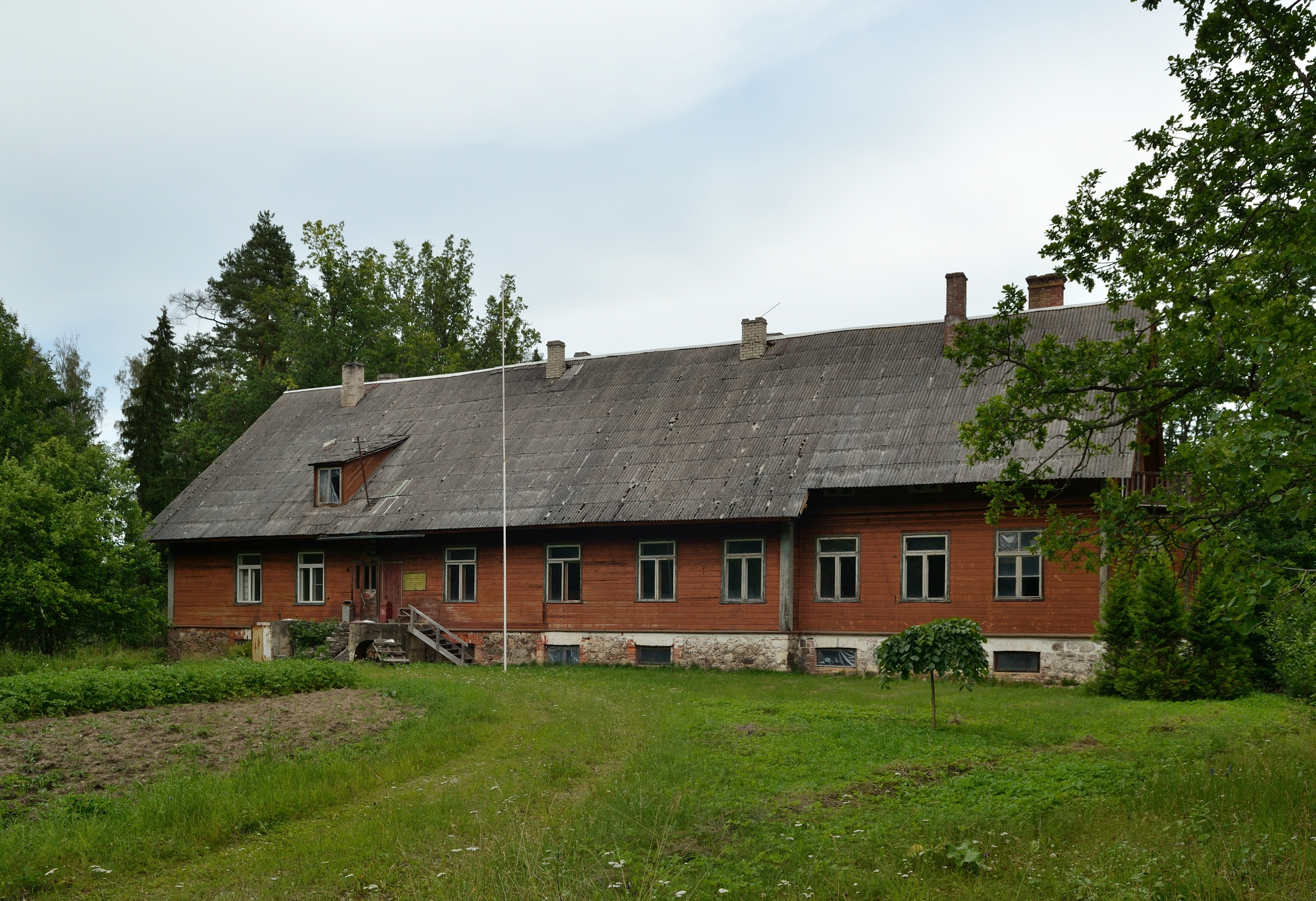
- Rahumäe manor
- Interactive map of Rahumäe
- Country: Estonia
- County: Põlva County
- Parish: Räpina Parish
- Time zone: UTC+2 (EET)
  - Summer (DST): UTC+3 (EEST)

Rahumäe (or Priitholmi) is a village in Räpina Parish, Põlva County in southeastern Estonia.
