= Võuküla =

Village in Estonia

Coordinates: 58°04′N 27°18′E

- Village
- Interactive map of Võuküla
- Country: Estonia
- County: Põlva County
- Parish: Räpina Parish
- Time zone: UTC+2 (EET)
  - Summer (DST): UTC+3 (EEST)

Võuküla is a village in Räpina Parish, Põlva County in southeastern Estonia.
