= Himmiste, Põlva County =

Village in Estonia

Coordinates: 57°57′35″N 27°12′08″E

Himmiste
- Village
- Interactive map of Himmiste
- Country: Estonia
- County: Põlva County
- Parish: Räpina Parish
- Time zone: UTC+2 (EET)
  - Summer (DST): UTC+3 (EEST)

Himmiste is a village in Räpina Parish, Põlva County in southeastern Estonia.

The highest maximum air temperature (38.0 °C) of Estonia has been recorded in Himmiste.
