= Mõtsavaara =

Village in Estonia

Coordinates: 58°00′52″N 27°19′39″E

- Village
- Interactive map of Mõtsavaara
- Country: Estonia
- County: Põlva County
- Parish: Räpina Parish
- Time zone: UTC+2 (EET)
  - Summer (DST): UTC+3 (EEST)

Mõtsavaara is a village in Räpina Parish, Põlva County in southeastern Estonia.
