= Koolmajärve =

Village in Estonia

Coordinates: 57°57′17″N 27°09′58″E

- Village
- Interactive map of Koolmajärve
- Country: Estonia
- County: Põlva County
- Parish: Räpina Parish
- Time zone: UTC+2 (EET)
  - Summer (DST): UTC+3 (EEST)

Koolmajärve is a village in Räpina Parish, Põlva County in southeastern Estonia.

Before the administrative reform of Estonian municipalities in 2017, the village belonged to Veriora municipality.
