= Laho, Räpina Parish =

Village in Estonia

Coordinates: 58°00′27″N 27°18′36″E

Laho
- Village
- Interactive map of Laho
- Country: Estonia
- County: Põlva County
- Parish: Räpina Parish
- Time zone: UTC+2 (EET)
  - Summer (DST): UTC+3 (EEST)

Laho is a village in Räpina Parish, Põlva County in southeastern Estonia.
