= August Janson =

Estonian politician

August Janson (2 November 1870 – 13 October 1925) was an Estonian politician.

Janson was born Võõpsu. In 1919, he was Minister of Industry and Commerce. He died in Berlin in 1925.
