= Vändra, Põlva County =

Village in Estonia

Coordinates: 57°59′29″N 27°21′53″E

Vändra
- Village
- Interactive map of Vändra
- Country: Estonia
- County: Põlva County
- Parish: Räpina Parish
- Time zone: UTC+2 (EET)
  - Summer (DST): UTC+3 (EEST)

Vändra is a village in Räpina Parish, Põlva County in southeastern Estonia.
