= Toolamaa, Põlva County =

Village in Estonia

Coordinates: 58°06′N 27°22′E

Toolamaa
- Village
- Interactive map of Toolamaa
- Country: Estonia
- County: Põlva County
- Parish: Räpina Parish
- Time zone: UTC+2 (EET)
  - Summer (DST): UTC+3 (EEST)

Toolamaa (or Saarõkülä) is a village in Räpina Parish, Põlva County in southeastern Estonia.
