= Väike-Veerksu =

Village in Estonia

Coordinates: 58°01′25″N 27°26′18″E

- Village
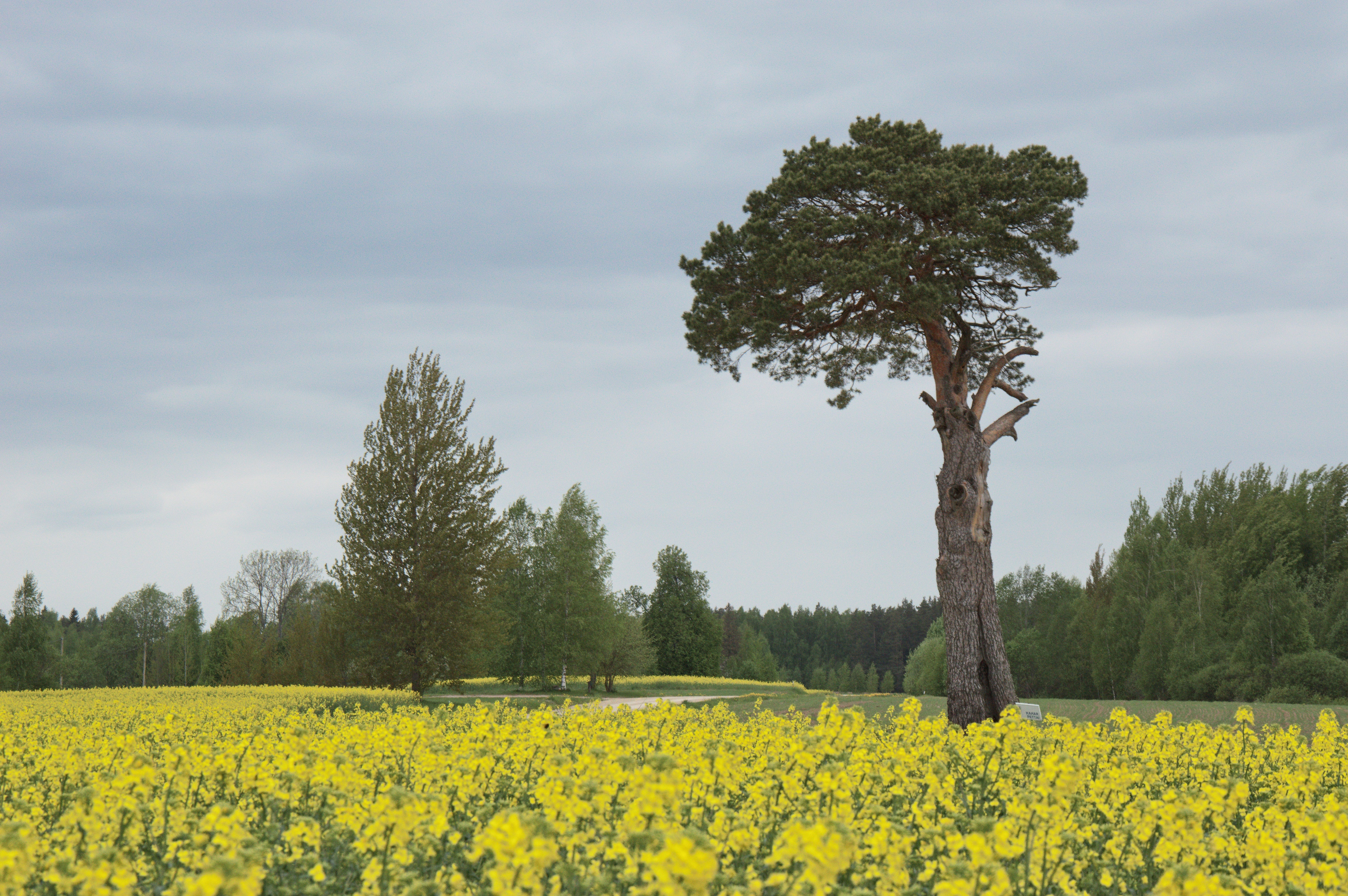
- Famous specimen of Pinus sylvestris in Väike-Veerksu
- Interactive map of Väike-Veerksu
- Country: Estonia
- County: Põlva County
- Parish: Räpina Parish
- Time zone: UTC+2 (EET)
  - Summer (DST): UTC+3 (EEST)

Väike-Veerksu is a village in Räpina Parish, Põlva County in southeastern Estonia.
