= Räpina Parish =

Municipality of Estonia (2017)

Coordinates: 58°5′51″N 27°27′54″E

Räpina Parish Räpina vald (in Estonian) Räpinä vald (in Võro)
- Municipality of Estonia
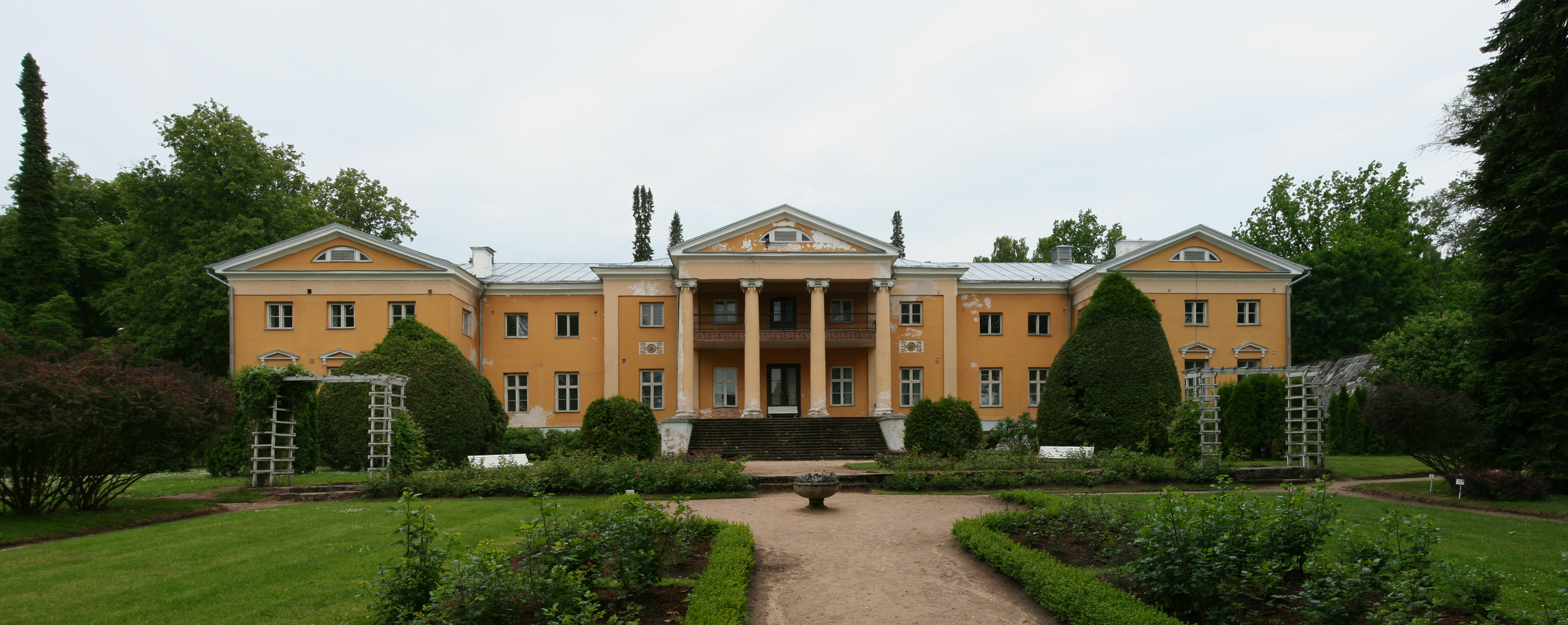
- Räpina manor

- Flag Coat of arms

- Räpina Parish within Põlva County
- Country: Estonia
- County: Põlva County
- Administrative centre: Räpina

Area
  - Total: 265.93 km^{2} (102.68 sq mi)

Population (01.01.2009)
  - Total: 5,533
  - Density: 20.81/km^{2} (53.89/sq mi)
- ISO 3166 code: EE-708
- Website: www.rapina.ee

Räpina Parish (Estonian: Räpina vald; Võro: Räpinä vald) is a rural municipality of Estonia, in Põlva County. It has a population of 4,611 (as of 2017) and an area of 265.93 km^{2}.

== Settlements ==
Town

Räpina

Small boroughs

Mehikoorma - Veriora - Võõpsu

Villages

Aravu - Haavametsa - Haavapää - Himmiste - Jaanikeste - Jõepera - Jõevaara - Jõeveere - Kassilaane - Kikka - Kirmsi - Kõnnu - Koolma - Koolmajärve - Köstrimäe - Kullamäe - Kunksilla - Laho - Leevaku - Leevi - Lihtensteini - Linte - Mägiotsa - Männisalu - Meeksi - Meelva - Meerapalu - Mõtsavaara - Naha - Nohipalo - Nulga - Pääsna - Pahtpää - Parapalu - Pedaspää - Pindi - Raadama - Rahumäe - Raigla - Ristipalo - Ruusa - Saareküla - Sarvemäe - Sikakurmu - Sillapää - Soohara - Sülgoja - Suure-Veerksu - Süvahavva - Timo - Toolamaa - Tooste - Tsirksi - Väike-Veerksu - Vändra - Vareste - Verioramõisa - Viira - Viluste - Vinso - Võiardi - Võika - Võuküla

== Religion ==
In the 2021 census of at least 15-years old permanent residents of the parish 17.5 per cent declared themselves Lutheran, 11.4 per cent declared themselves Orthodox, 0.7 per cent as others Christians. 0.7 per cent of the population followed other religions. 67.5 per cent declared themselves religiously unaffiliated. The affiliation of 2.0 per cent remained unknown in the census.

== Notable people ==
- August Janson (1870 in Võõpsu – 1925), politician, Minister of Industry and Commerce in 1919
- Harry Bjørnholm (1891 in Räpina Parish – 1961), a Danish modern pentathlete, competed at the 1920 Summer Olympics
- John Bulin (1893 in Võõpsu – 1941), a Russian Orthodox bishop and head of Pechory Monastery, 1920 to 1932.
- Vaino Vahing (1940 in Aravu – 2008), writer, prosaist, psychiatrist and playwright.
