= Võõpsu =

Borough in Estonia

- Small borough
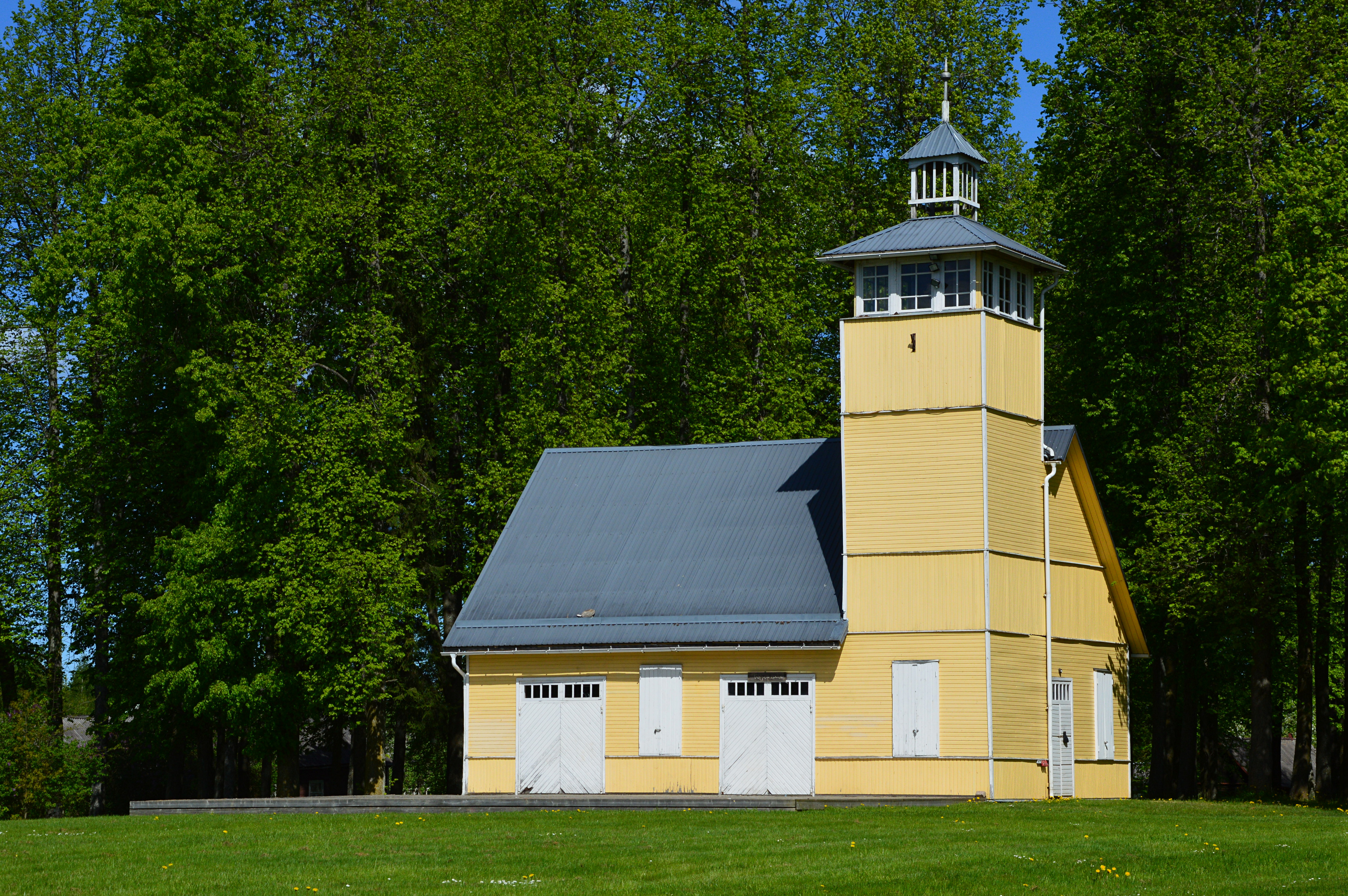
- Former fire shed in Võõpsu

- Location in Estonia
- Coordinates: 58°05′N 27°32′E
- Country: Estonia
- County: Põlva County
- Municipality: Räpina Parish

Population (2011 Census)
  - Total: 195

Võõpsu is a small borough (Estonian: alevik) in Räpina Parish, Põlva County, Estonia. As of the 2011 census, the settlement's population was 195.

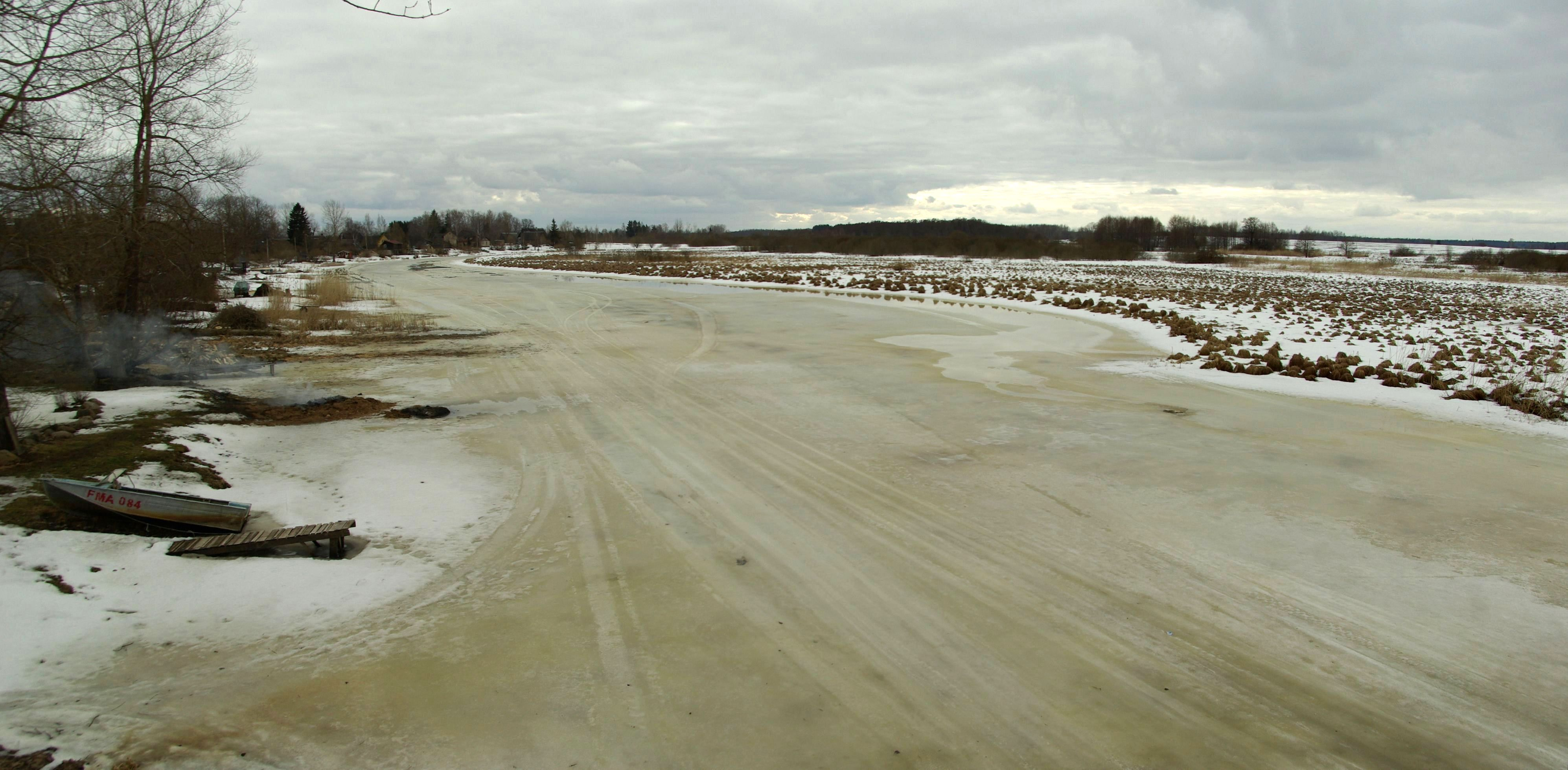
The Võhandu River, frozen in winter
