= Harry Bjørnholm =

Danish modern pentathlete

Personal information
- Born: 20 July 1891 Räpina, Estonia
- Died: 20 November 1961 (aged 70) Copenhagen, Denmark

Sport
- Sport: Modern pentathlon

Harry Bjørnholm (20 July 1891 – 20 November 1961) was a Danish modern pentathlete who competed at the 1920 Summer Olympics.
