= John Bulin =

Russian bishop (1893–1941)

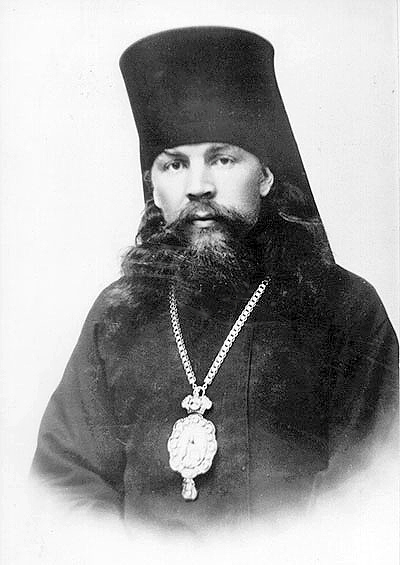
Nikolai Bulin

John (Bulin) (Russian: Иоанн Булин, secular name Nikolai Aleksandovich Bulin; 16 February 1893 Võõpsu, Kreis Werro, Governorate of Livonia – 30 July 1941 Leningrad, USSR) was a Russian Orthodox bishop.

He was the head of Pechory Monastery from 1920 to 1932.

He was a member of the IV and V Riigikogu. He was arrested by the NKVD on 18 October 1940, sentenced to death on 8 April 1941 and shot on 30 July 1941 in Leningrad.
