= Lihtensteini =

Village in Estonia

Coordinates: 57°55′N 27°16′E

- Village
- Interactive map of Lihtensteini
- Country: Estonia
- County: Põlva County
- Parish: Räpina Parish
- Time zone: UTC+2 (EET)
  - Summer (DST): UTC+3 (EEST)

Lihtensteini is a village in Räpina Parish, Põlva County in southeastern Estonia.
