= Viira, Põlva County =

Village in Estonia

Coordinates: 57°59′40″N 27°11′22″E

Viira
- Village
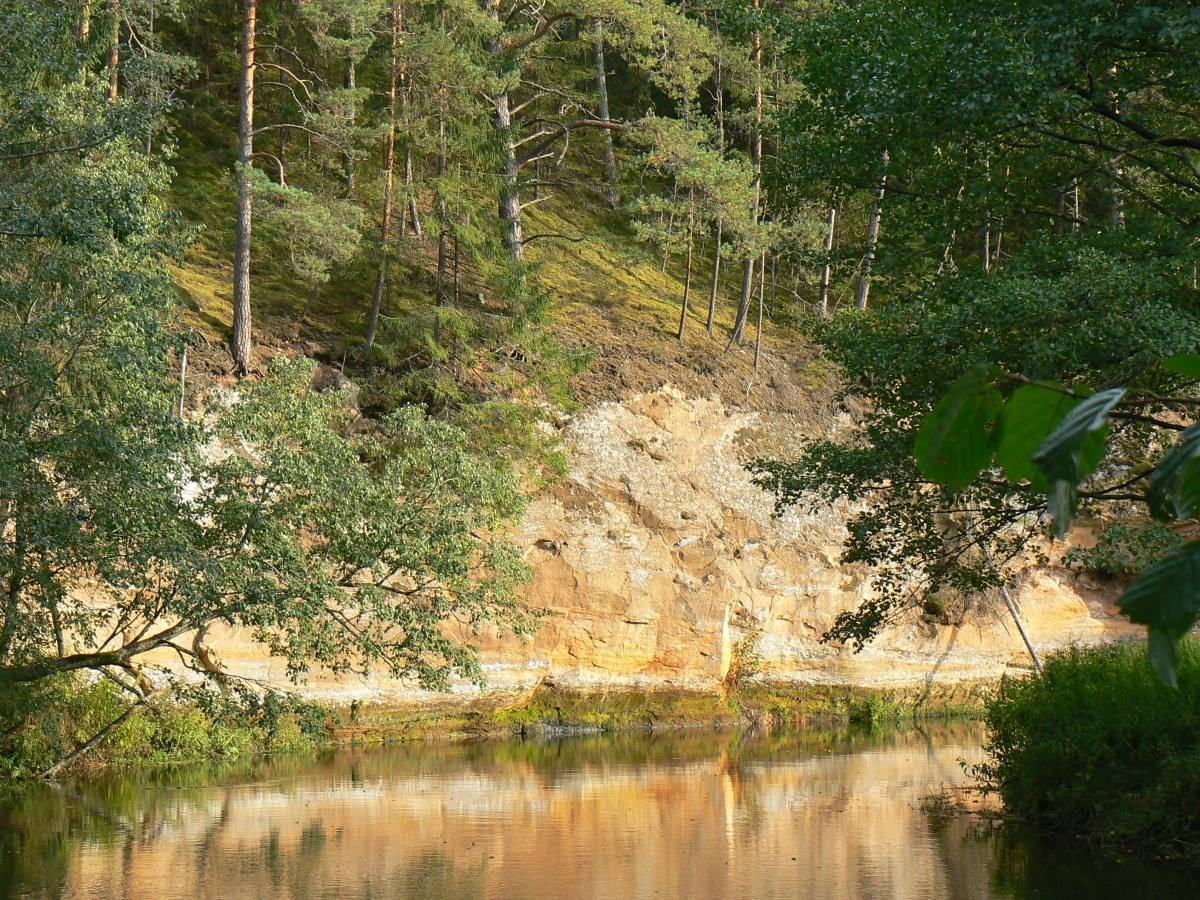
- Interactive map of Viira
- Country: Estonia
- County: Põlva County
- Parish: Räpina Parish
- Time zone: UTC+2 (EET)
  - Summer (DST): UTC+3 (EEST)

Viira is a village in Räpina Parish, Põlva County in southeastern Estonia.
