= Kikka, Estonia =

Village in Estonia

Coordinates: 57°59′N 27°23′E

Kikka
- Village
- Interactive map of Kikka
- Country: Estonia
- County: Põlva County
- Parish: Räpina Parish
- Time zone: UTC+2 (EET)
  - Summer (DST): UTC+3 (EEST)

Kikka is a village in Räpina Parish, Põlva County in southeastern Estonia.

== Geography ==
It is located 12 kilometers south of the municipality center, Räpina, and 19 kilometers northeast of the county center, Põlva. The altitude above sea level is 58 meters.

The village is home to the Ilumetsa railway station.

The climate is temperate. The official language is Estonian. The postal code is 64206.

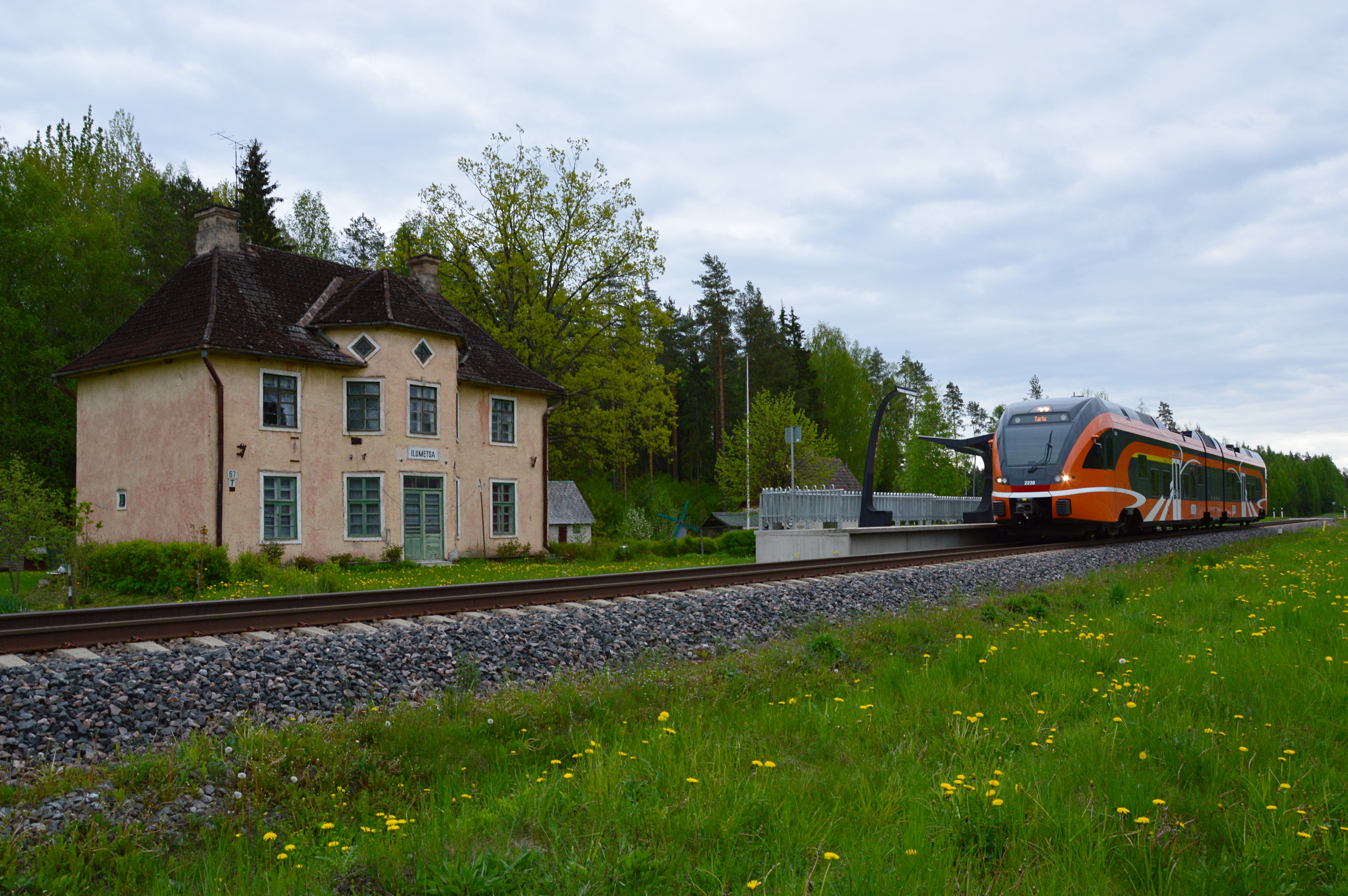
Ilumetsa railway station in Kikka.

Preceding station	Elron	Following station
Veriora towards Tallinn	Tallinn–Tartu–Koidula	Orava towards Koidula
