= Kullamäe, Põlva County =

Village in Estonia

Coordinates: 58°00′21″N 27°22′53″E

Kullamäe
- Village
- Interactive map of Kullamäe
- Country: Estonia
- County: Põlva County
- Parish: Räpina Parish
- Time zone: UTC+2 (EET)
  - Summer (DST): UTC+3 (EEST)

Kullamäe is a village in Räpina Parish, Põlva County in southeastern Estonia.
