= Kullamäe, Harju County =

Village in Estonia

Coordinates: 59°30′N 25°19′E

Kullamäe
- Village
- Interactive map of Kullamäe
- Country: Estonia
- County: Harju County
- Parish: Jõelähtme Parish
- Time zone: UTC+2 (EET)
  - Summer (DST): UTC+3 (EEST)

Kullamäe is a village in Jõelähtme Parish, Harju County in northern Estonia.
