= Võhandu =

River in Estonia

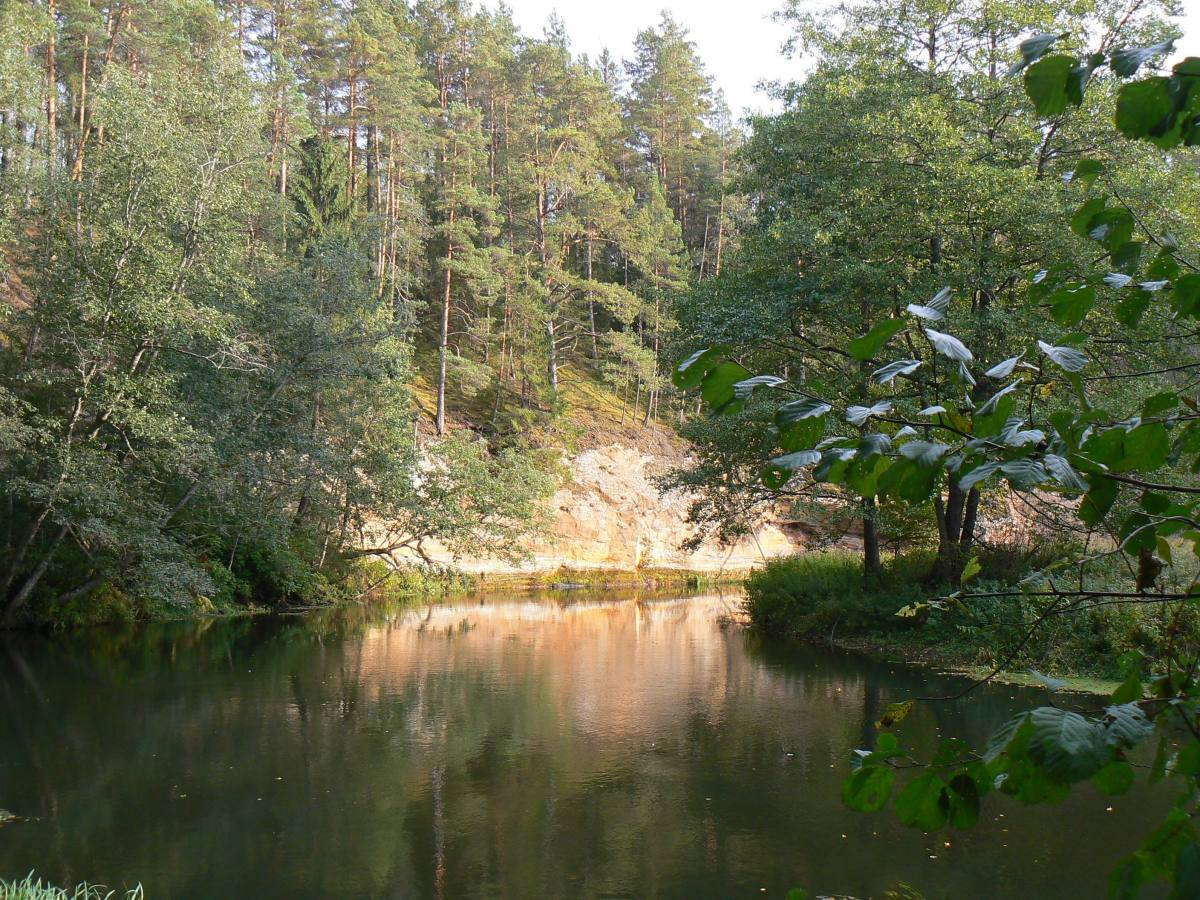
- The Võhandu at Viira Wall

Location
- Country: Estonia

Physical characteristics
- Source
  - location: near Saverna
  - coordinates: 58°03′42″N 26°42′58″E
  - elevation: 132 m (433 ft)
- Mouth
  - location: Lake Lämmi
  - coordinates: 58°06′04″N 27°33′16″E
  - elevation: 30 m (98 ft)
- Length: 166 km (103 mi)
- Basin size: 1,426 km^{2} (551 sq mi)
- Discharge
  - average: 5.5–6.0 m^{3}/s (190–210 cu ft/s)

Basin features
- Progression: Lake Peipus→ Narva→ Gulf of Finland

The Võhandu (Estonian: Võhandu) is the longest river entirely in Estonia. It is 166 km (103 mi) long and drains 1,426 km^{2} (551 sq mi). The river begins near the village of Saverna in Põlva County and empties into Lake Lämmi, part of Lake Peipus.

In 1964, a protected area was established in the Võhandu Valley.
