= Põlva County =

County of Estonia

Coordinates: 58°05′N 27°05′E

Põlva County Põlvamaa
- County
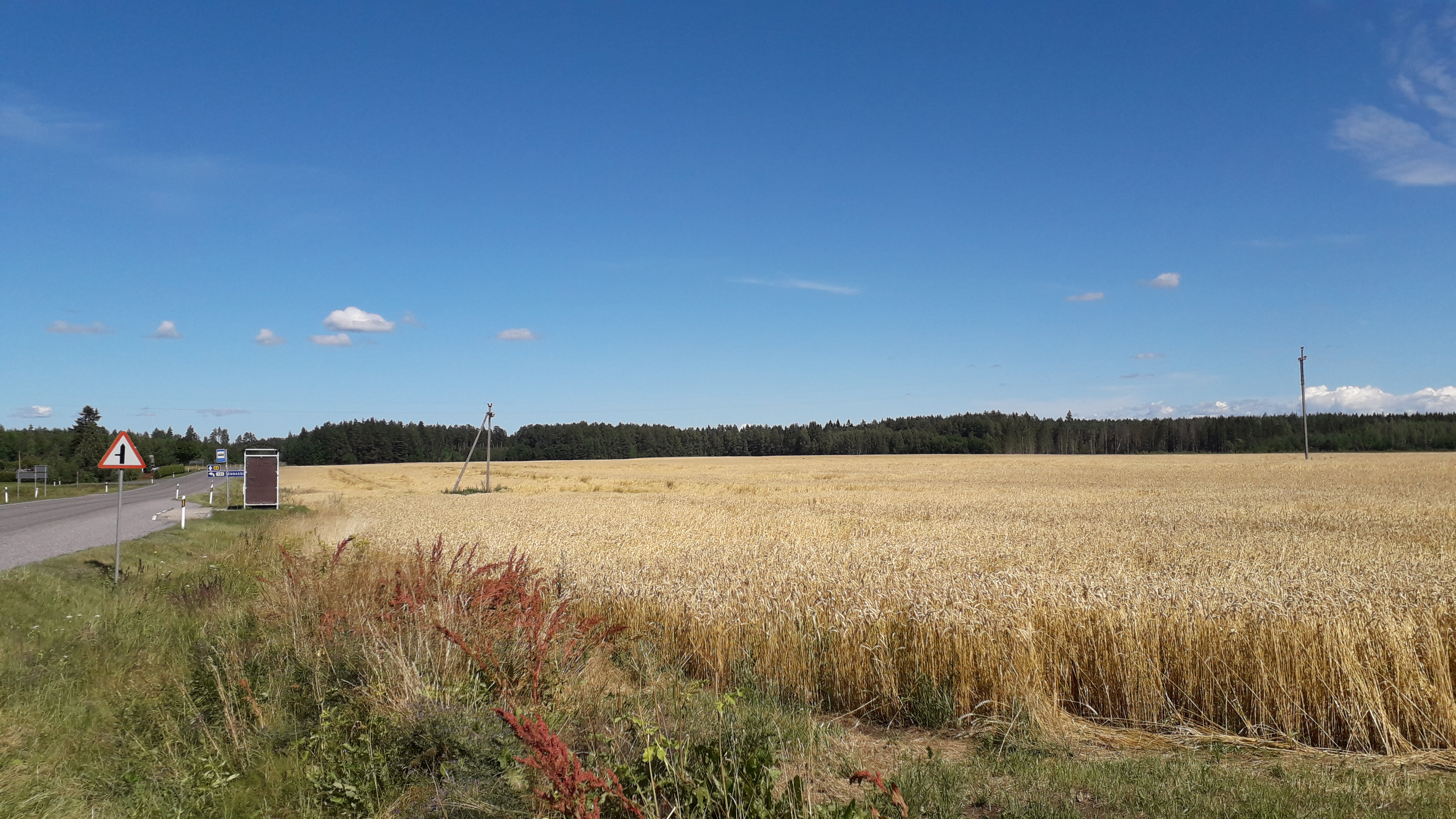
- Central part of Põlva County, Põlva Parish

- Flag Coat of arms

- Country: Estonia
- Capital: Põlva

Area
  - Total: 2,164.77 km^{2} (835.82 sq mi)

Population (2022)
  - Total: 23,989
  - Rank: 13th
  - Density: 11.082/km^{2} (28.701/sq mi)

Ethnicity
  - Estonians: 95%
  - other: 5%

GDP
  - Total: €347 million (2022)
  - Per capita: €14,450 (2022)
- ISO 3166 code: EE-64
- Vehicle registration: O
- Website: www.polvamaa.ee

Põlva County (Estonian: Põlva maakond or Põlvamaa) is one of 15 counties of Estonia. It is located in the southeastern part of the country and borders Tartu, Valga, and Võru counties. 23,989 people live in Põlva County, constituting 1.8% of the total population of Estonia (as of 2022).

== Government ==
The County Government (Estonian: Maavalitsus) is led by the Governor (Estonian: maavanem), who is appointed by the Government of Estonia for a term of five years. Since 2007, the governor position has been held by Priit Sibul.

== Municipalities ==
The county is subdivided into municipalities. There are three rural municipalities (Estonian: vallad 'parishes') in Põlva County.

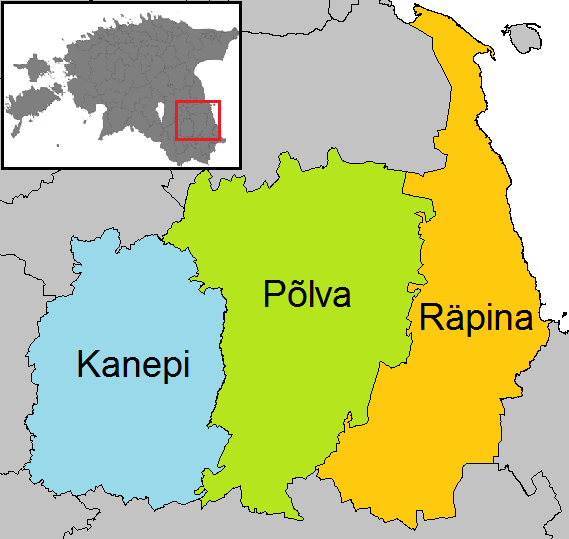
Municipalities of Põlva County

Rank	Municipality	Type	Population (2018)	Area km^{2}	Density
1	Kanepi Parish	Rural	4,864	525	9.3
2	Põlva Parish	Rural	14,273	706	20.2
3	Räpina Parish	Rural	6,518	591	11.0

== Demographics ==
27,028 people live in Põlva County – constituting 2.1% of the total population in Estonia (as of January 2013).

== Culture ==
1951–2019, the county had its newspaper: Koit. The last chief editor (since 2000) was Kauno Kõima.

=== Religion ===
The Lutheran congregations in the county are under Võru Deanery of the Estonian Evangelical Lutheran Church.

Eastern Orthodoxy congregations in the county are under the jurisdiction of the Estonian Apostolic Orthodox Church.

The independent Estonian Charismatic Church of Fellowship also operates in the county.

Other Christian congregations such as Baptists, Methodists, Jehovah's Witnesses, and others operate in the county.

There is also a congregation of the Estonian Neopagan religion operating in the county.

Religious affiliations in Põlva County census 2000–2021*
Religion	2000		2011		2021	
Religion	Number	%	Number	%	Number	%
Christianity	8,318	31.9	6,021	25.6	3,990	19.4
—Orthodox Christians	2,080	8.0	1,841	7.8	1,170	5.7
—Lutherans	5,891	22.6	3,835	16.3	2,550	12.4
—Catholics	42	0.1	15	0.06	30	0.1
—Baptists	51	0.2	49	0.2	50	0.2
—Jehovah's Witnesses	132	0.5	157	0.6	90	0.4
—Pentecostals	57	0.2	24	0.1	-	-
—Old Believers	18	0.06	17	0.7	-	-
—Methodists	33	0.1	15	0.06	-	-
—Adventists	14	0.05	18	0.06	-	-
—Other Christians	-	-	50	0.2	100	0.4
Islam	4	0.1	6	0.02	-	-
Buddhism	-	-	11	0.04	-	-
Other religions**	89	0.3	221	0.9	370	1.8
No religion	10,706	41.1	13,801	58.7	13,480	65.6
Not stated***	6,937	26.6	3,461	14.7	2,610	12.7
Total population*	26,054		23,501		20,530	
*The censuses of Estonia count the religious affiliations of the population older than 15 years of age. ".

== Gallery ==
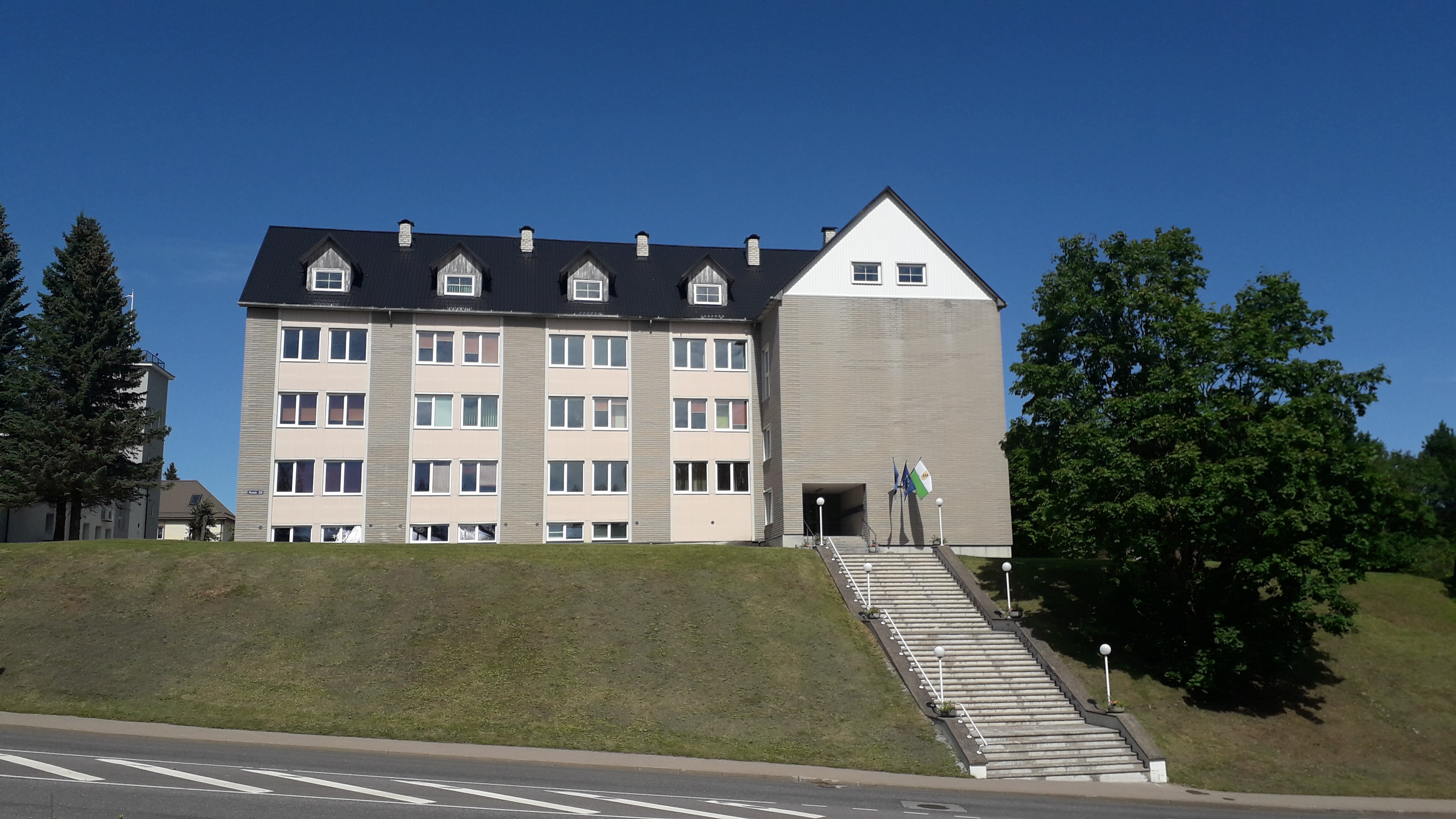
Põlva County administration building

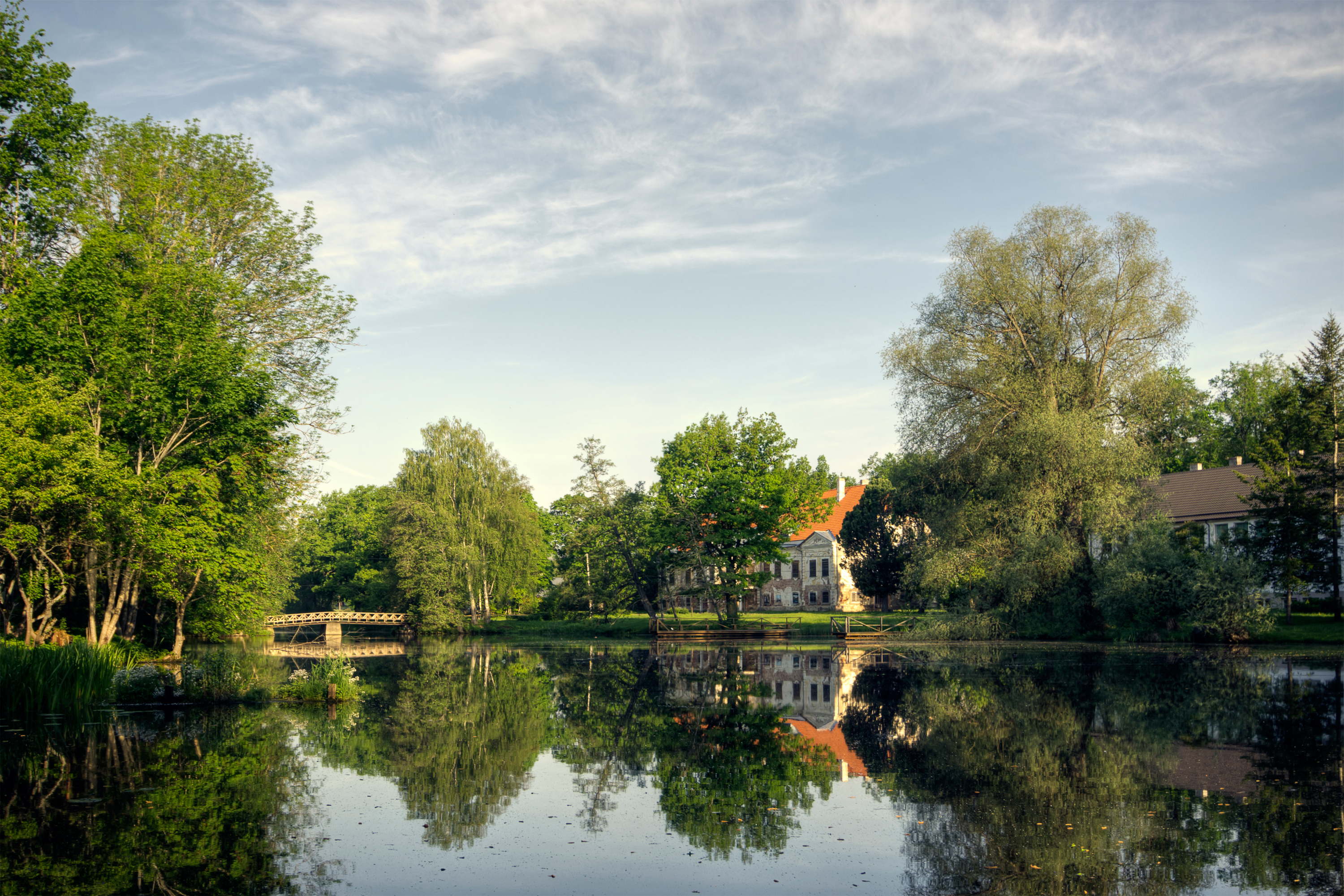
Ahja

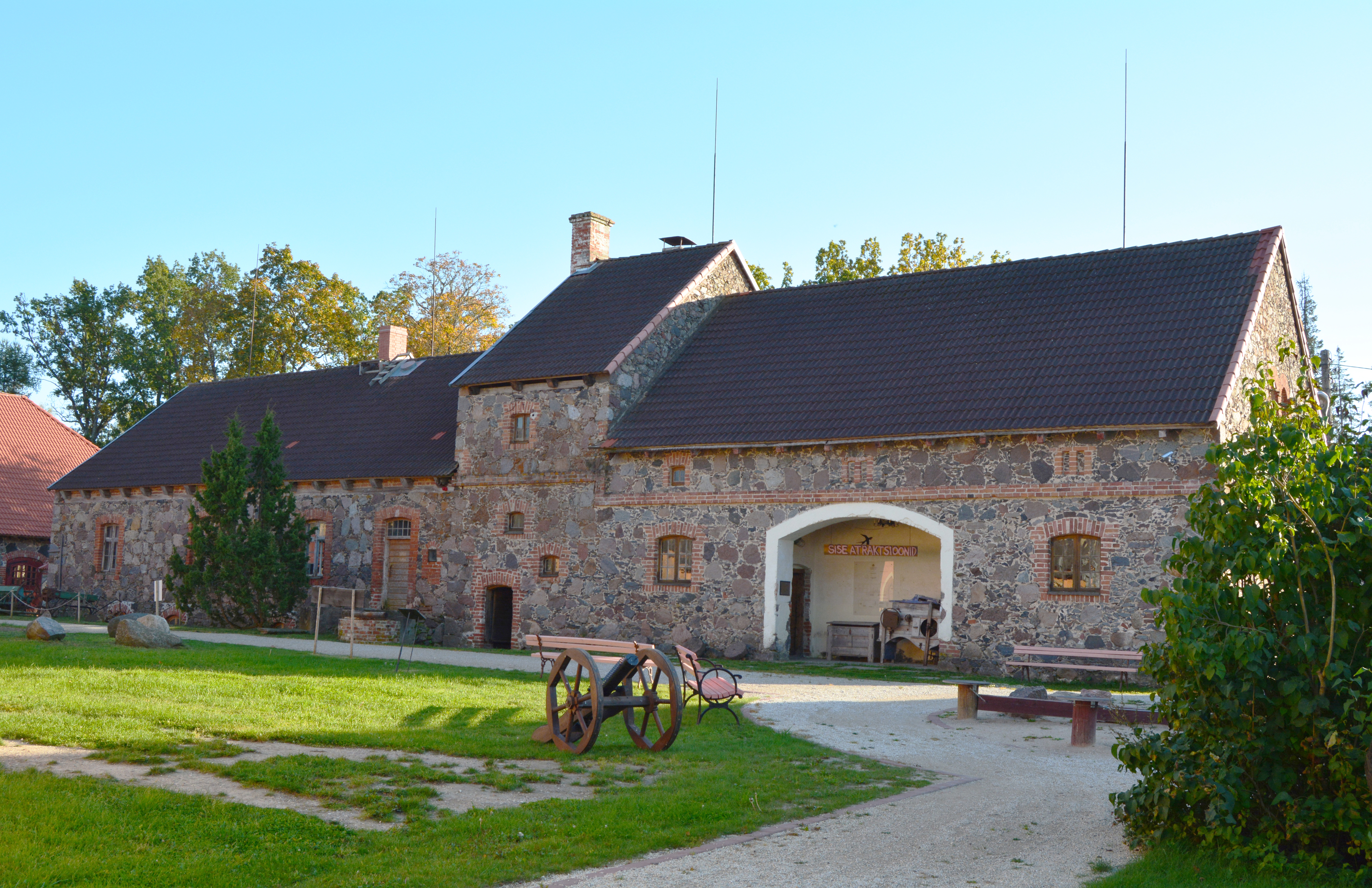
Pikajärve manor granary

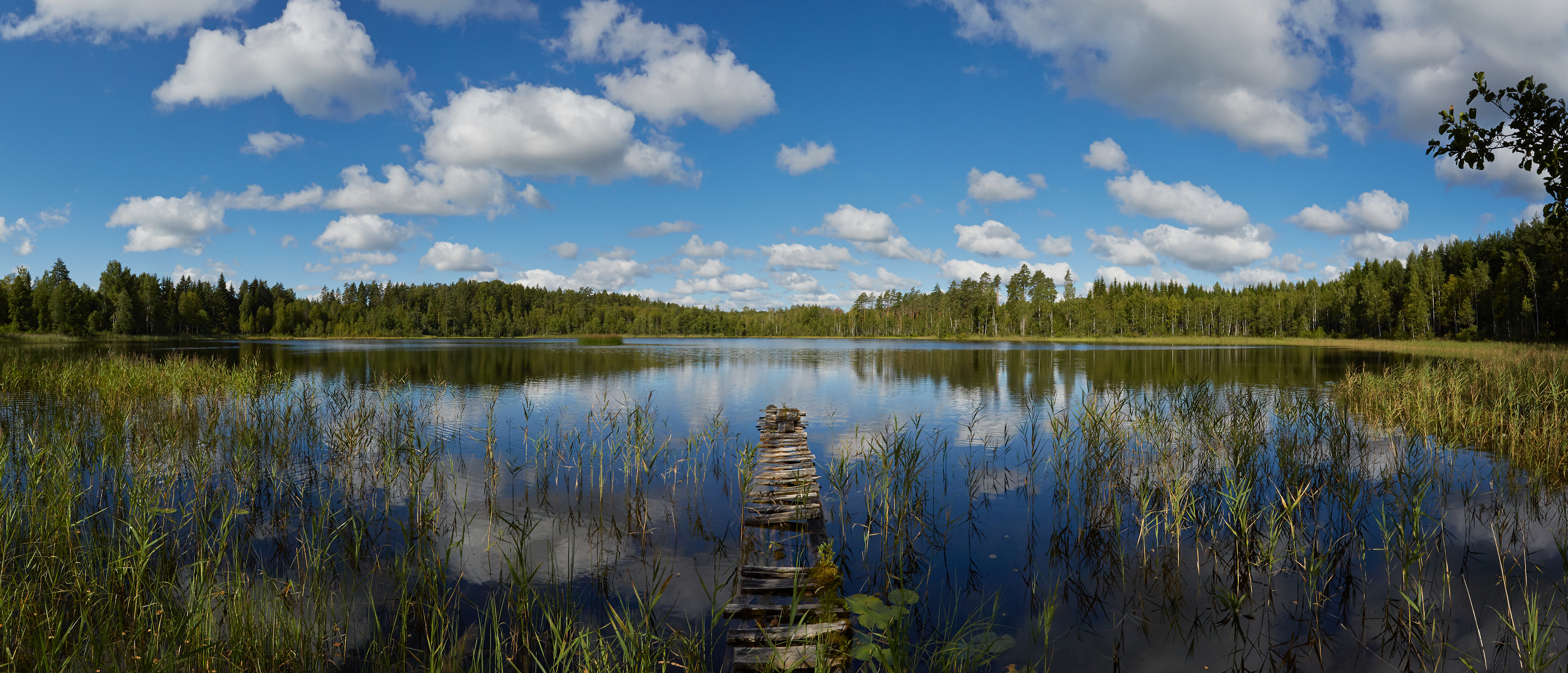
Lake Aalupi

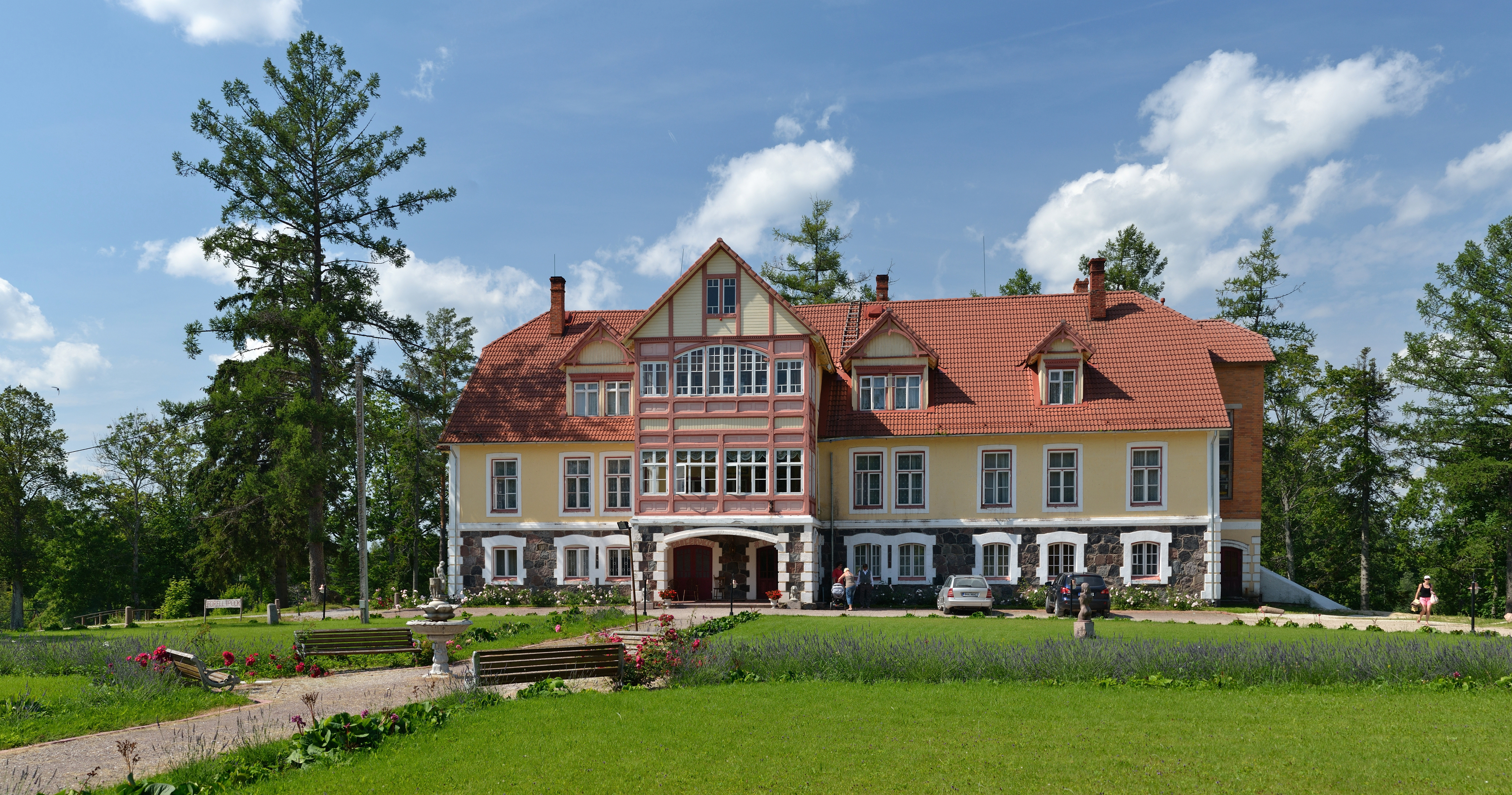
Pikajärve manor

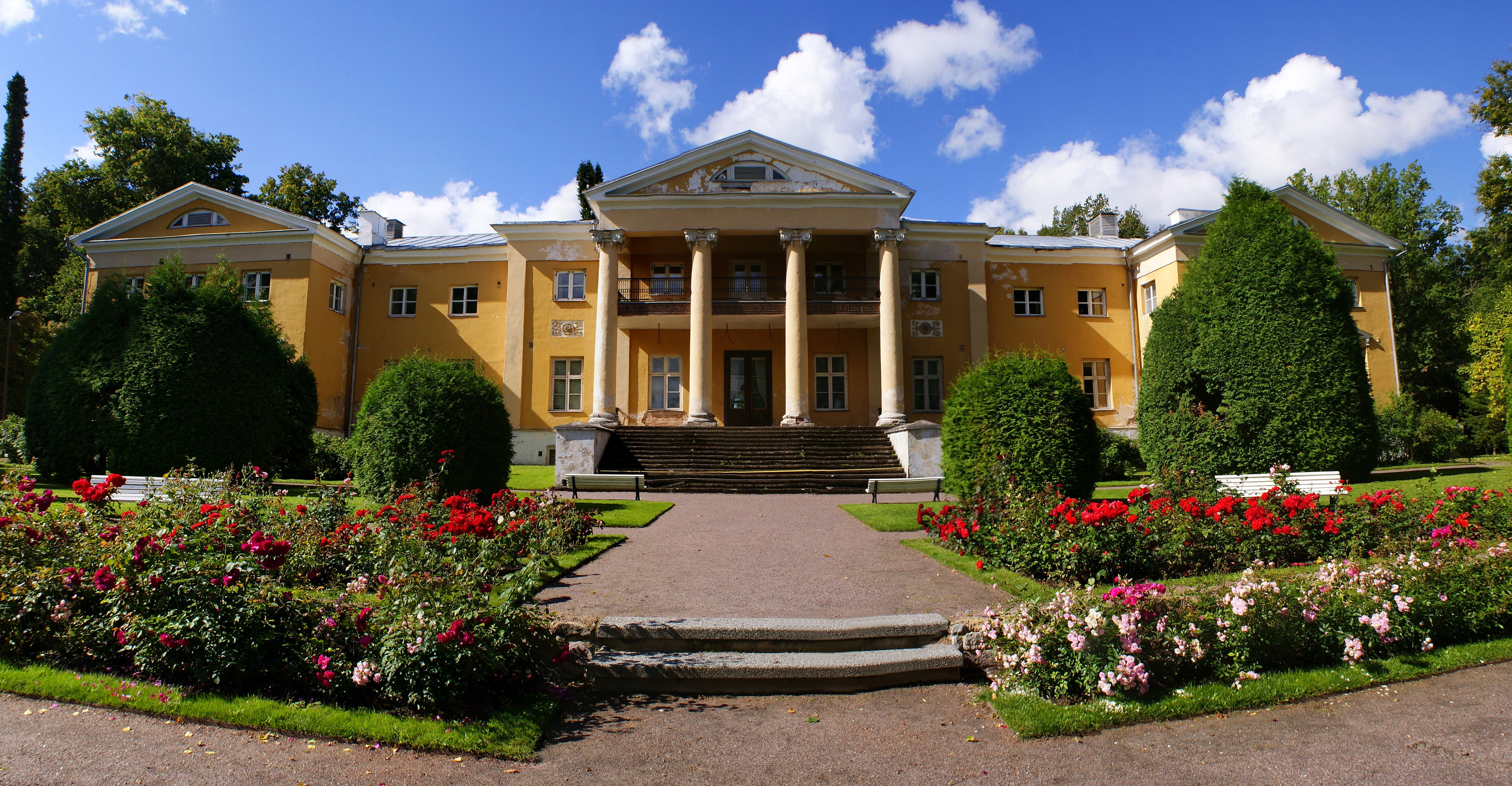
Räpina manor

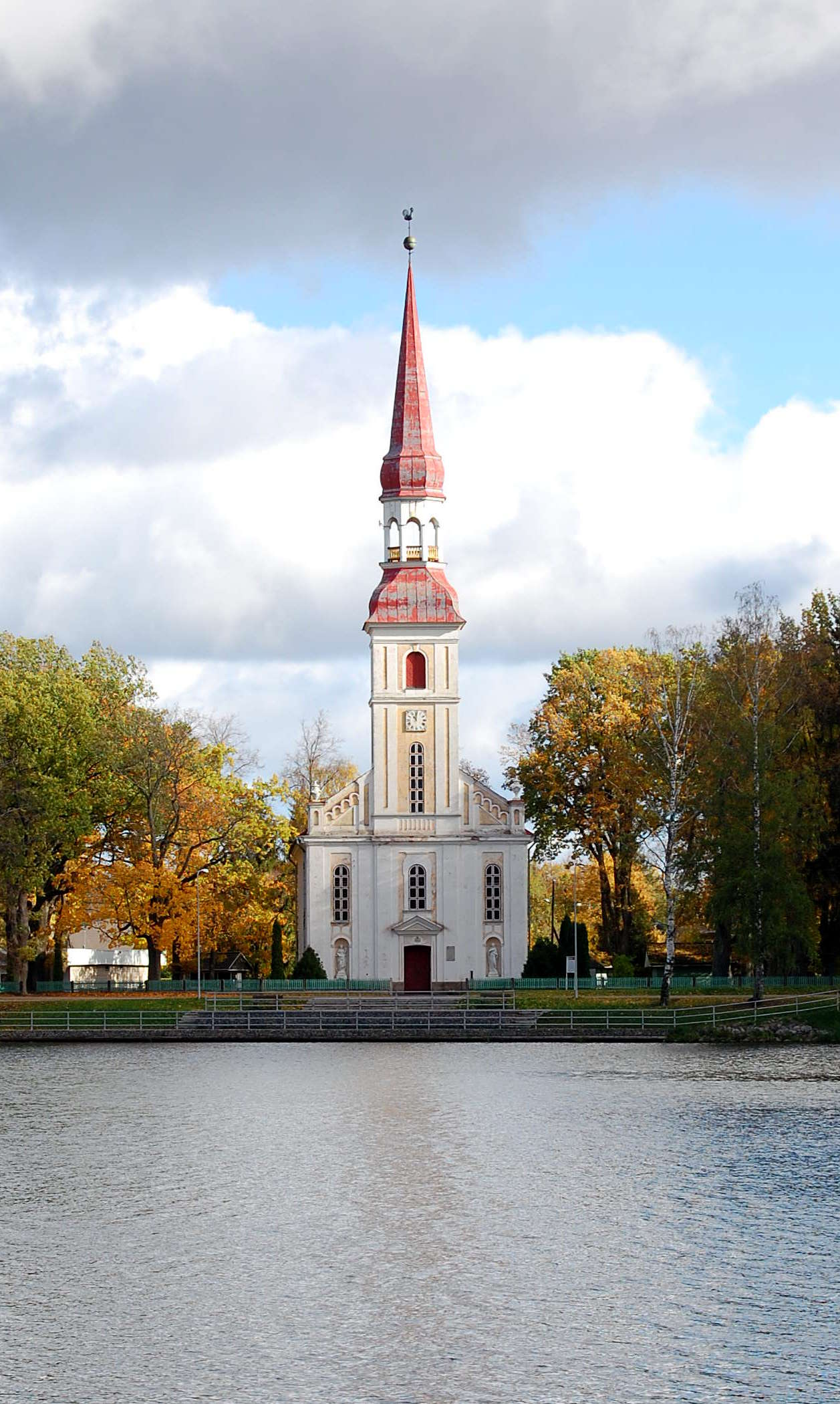
St. Michael's church in Räpina

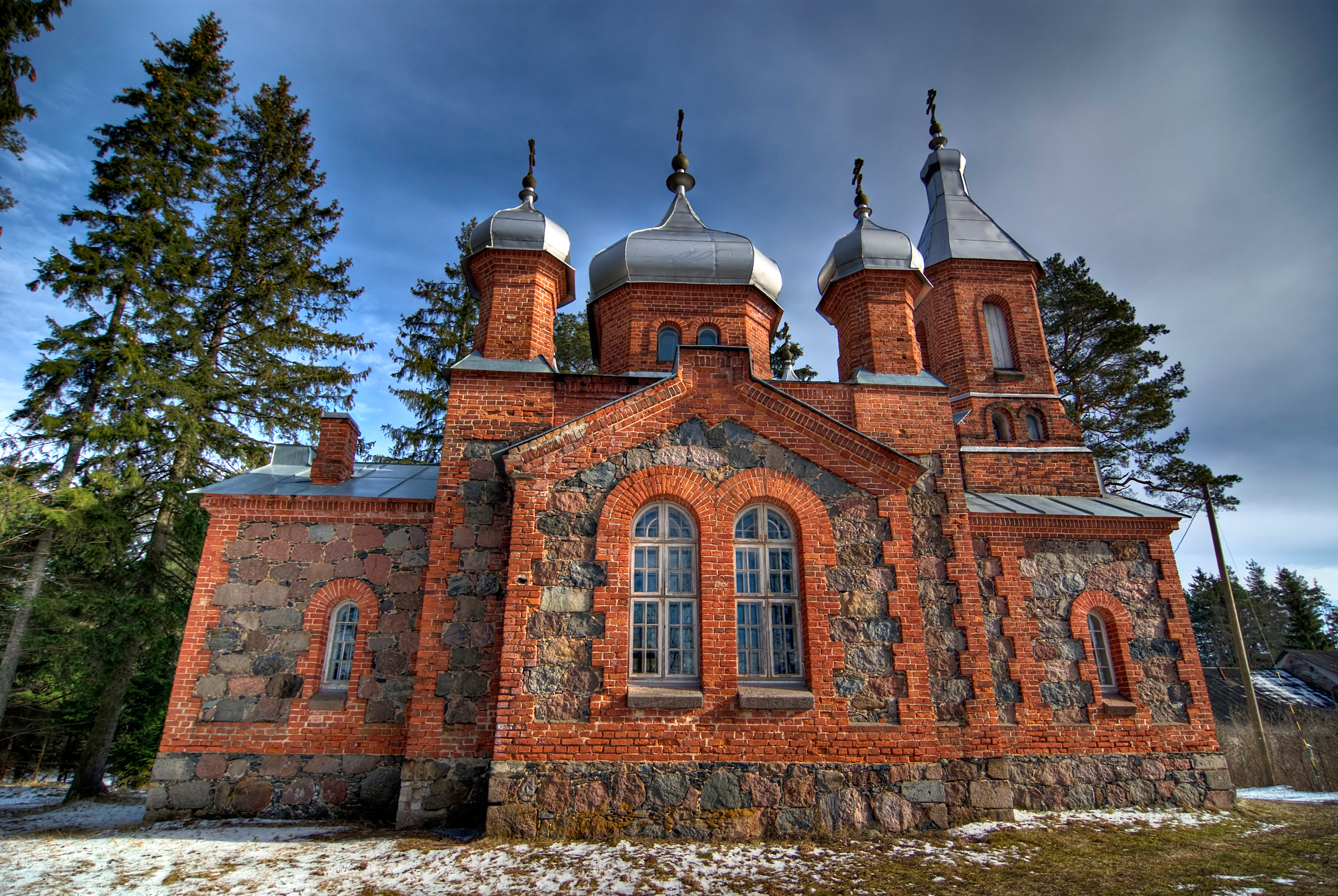
Kärsa orthodox church

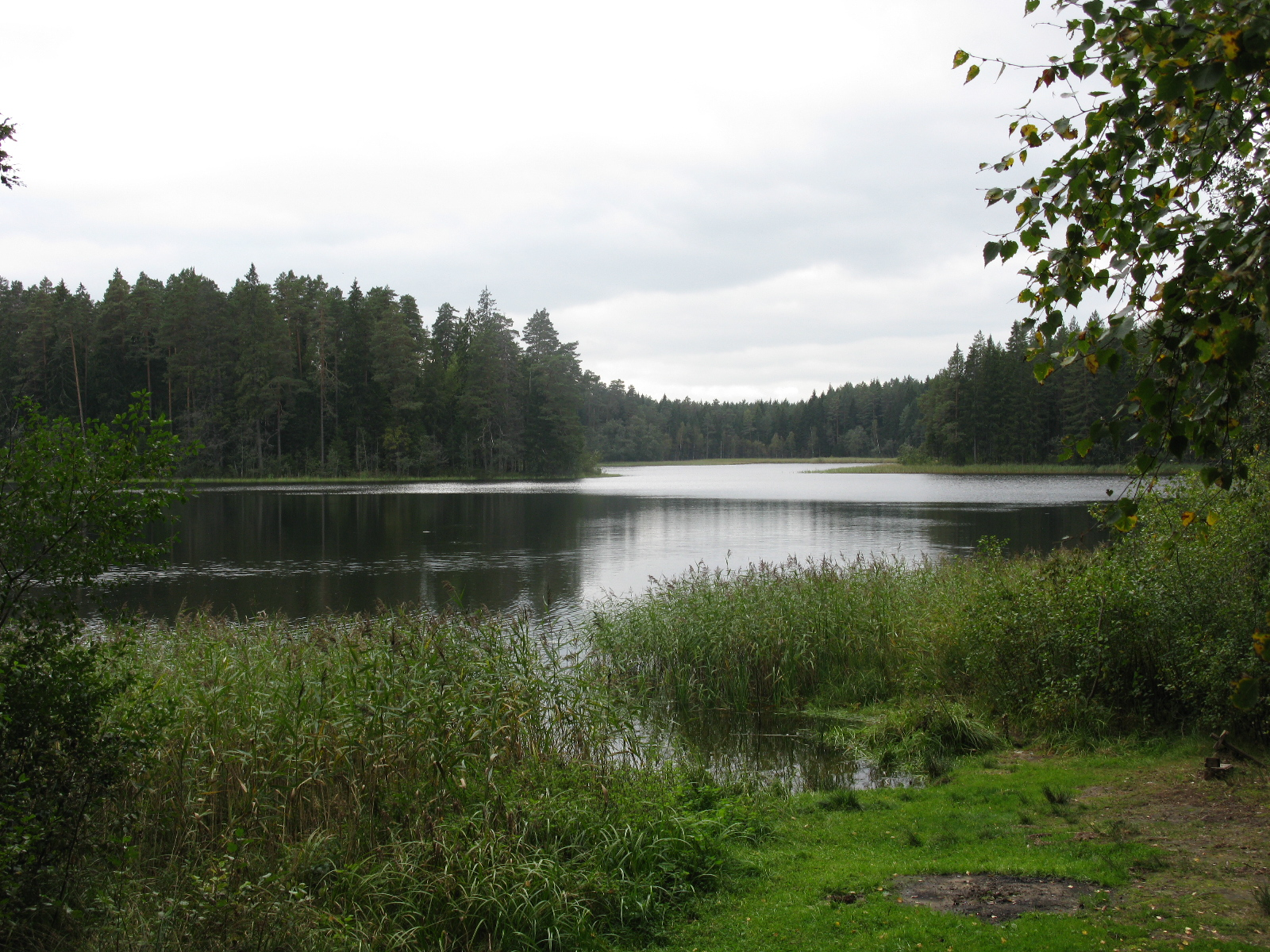
Lake Kõvverjärv

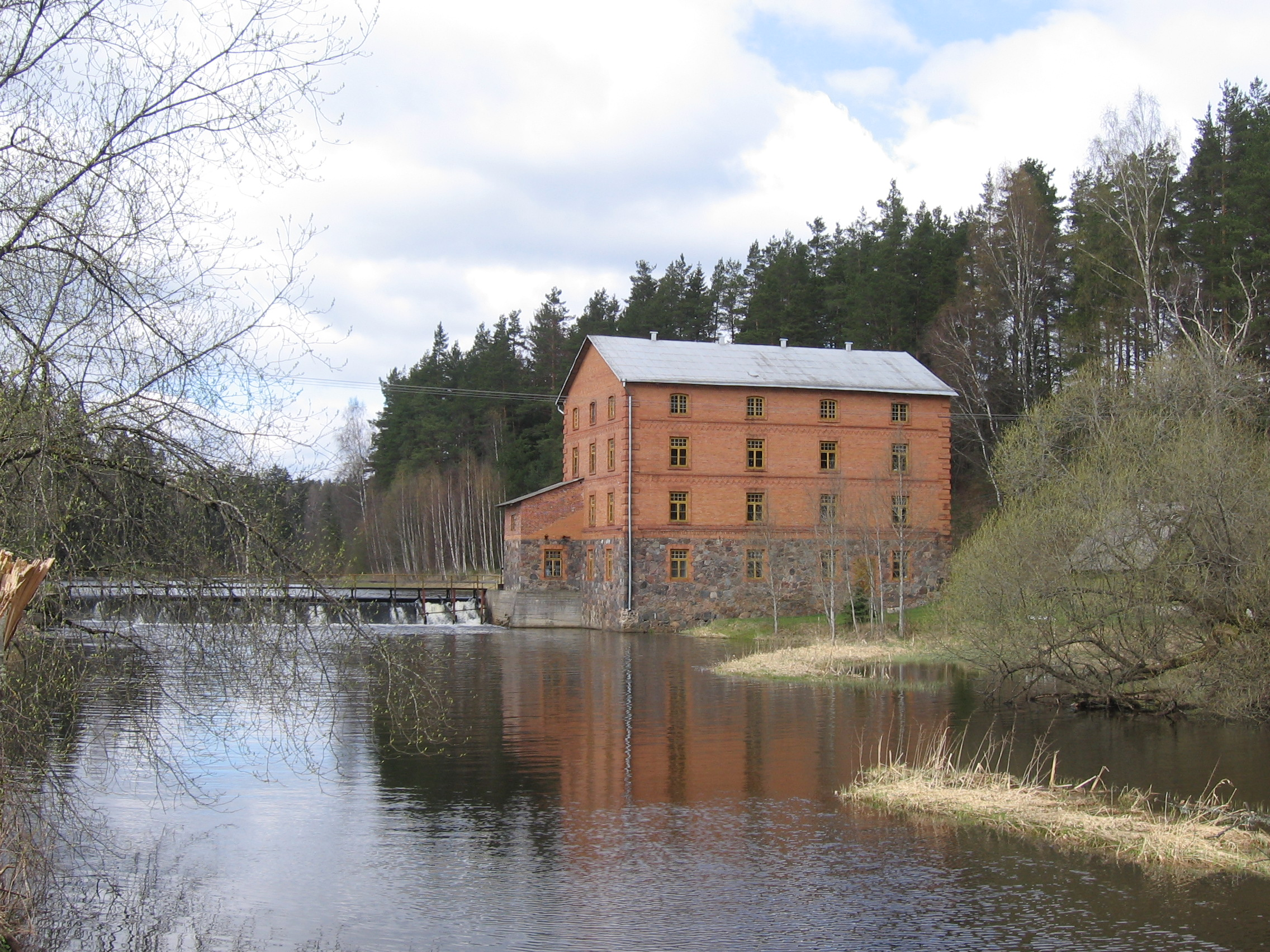
Kiidjärve watermill
