= Valgjärve Parish =

Former municipality of Estonia

Coordinates: 58°4′13″N 26°44′21″E

Valgjärve Parish Valgjärve vald
- Former municipality of Estonia
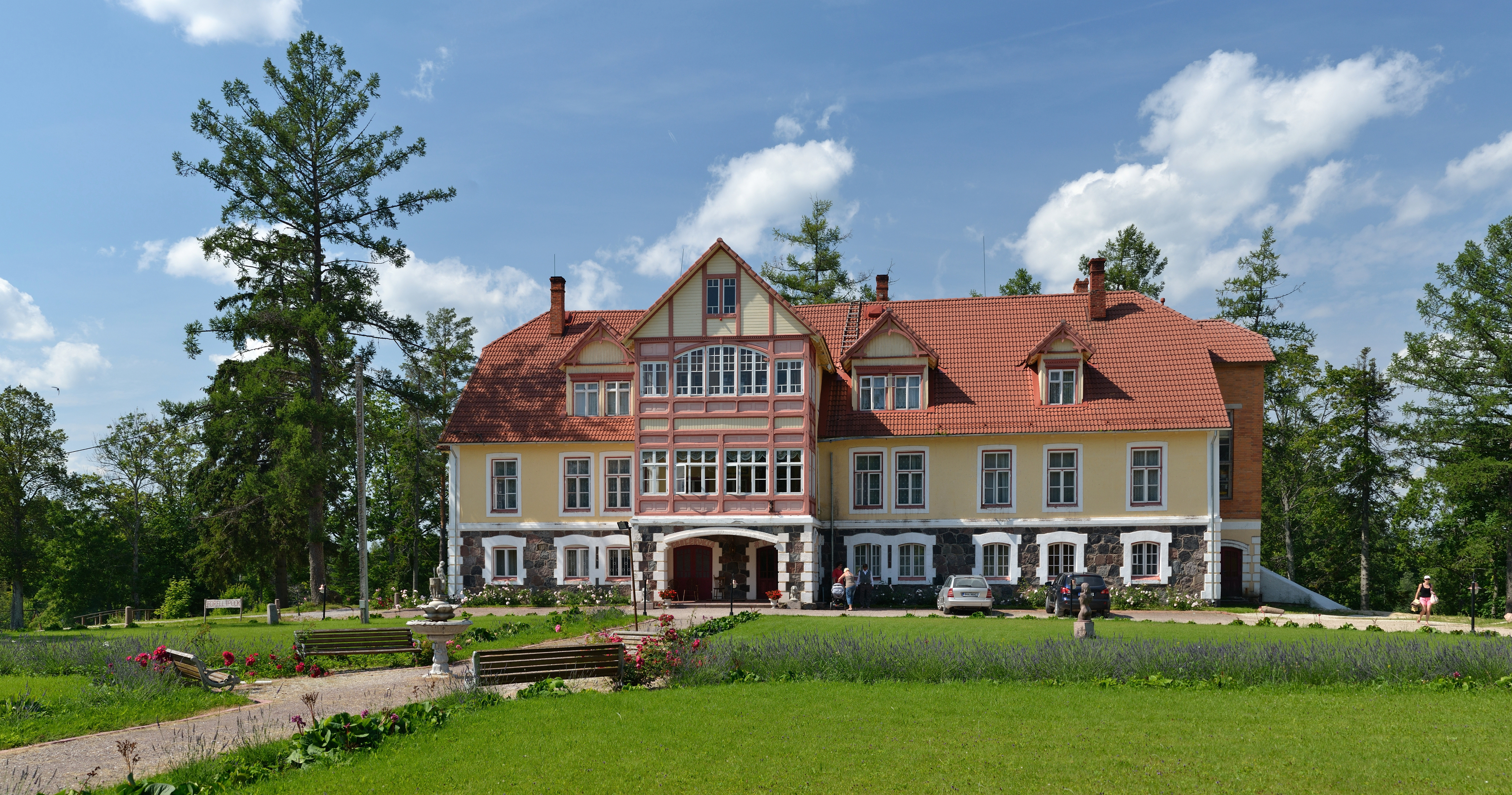
- Pikajärve manor

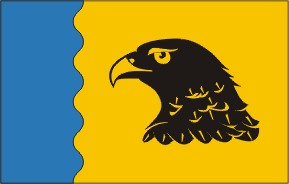
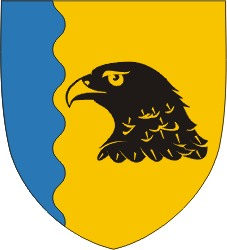
- Flag Coat of arms

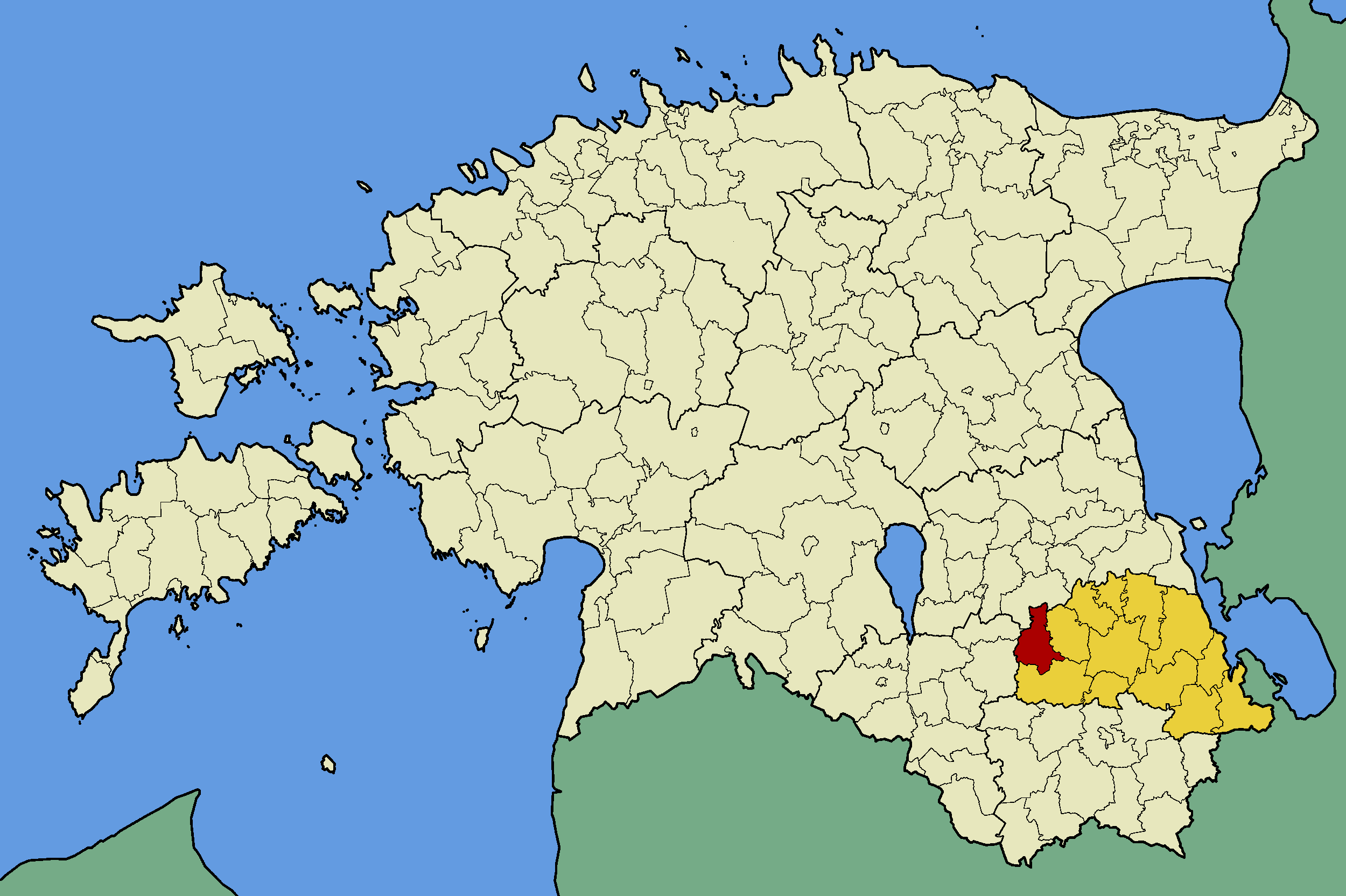
- Valgjärve Parish within Põlva County.
- Country: Estonia
- County: Põlva County
- Administrative centre: Saverna

Area
  - Total: 143.02 km^{2} (55.22 sq mi)

Population (01.01.2009)
  - Total: 1,562
  - Density: 10.92/km^{2} (28.29/sq mi)
- Website: www.valgjarve.ee

Valgjärve Parish (Estonian: Valgjärve vald) was a rural municipality of Estonia, in Põlva County. It had a population of 1,562 (as of 1 January 2009) and an area of 143.02 km².

== Settlements ==
Villages

Abissaare - Aiaste - Hauka - Kitse - Kooli - Krüüdneri - Maaritsa - Mügra - Pikajärve - Pikareinu - Puugi - Saverna - Sirvaste - Sulaoja - Tiido - Valgjärve - Vissi

== See also ==
- Valgjärve TV Mast
