= Kõlleste Parish =

Former municipality of Estonia

Coordinates: 58°4′26″N 26°50′7″E

Kõlleste Parish Kõlleste vald (in Estonian) Kõllõstõ vald (in Võro)
- Municipality of Estonia
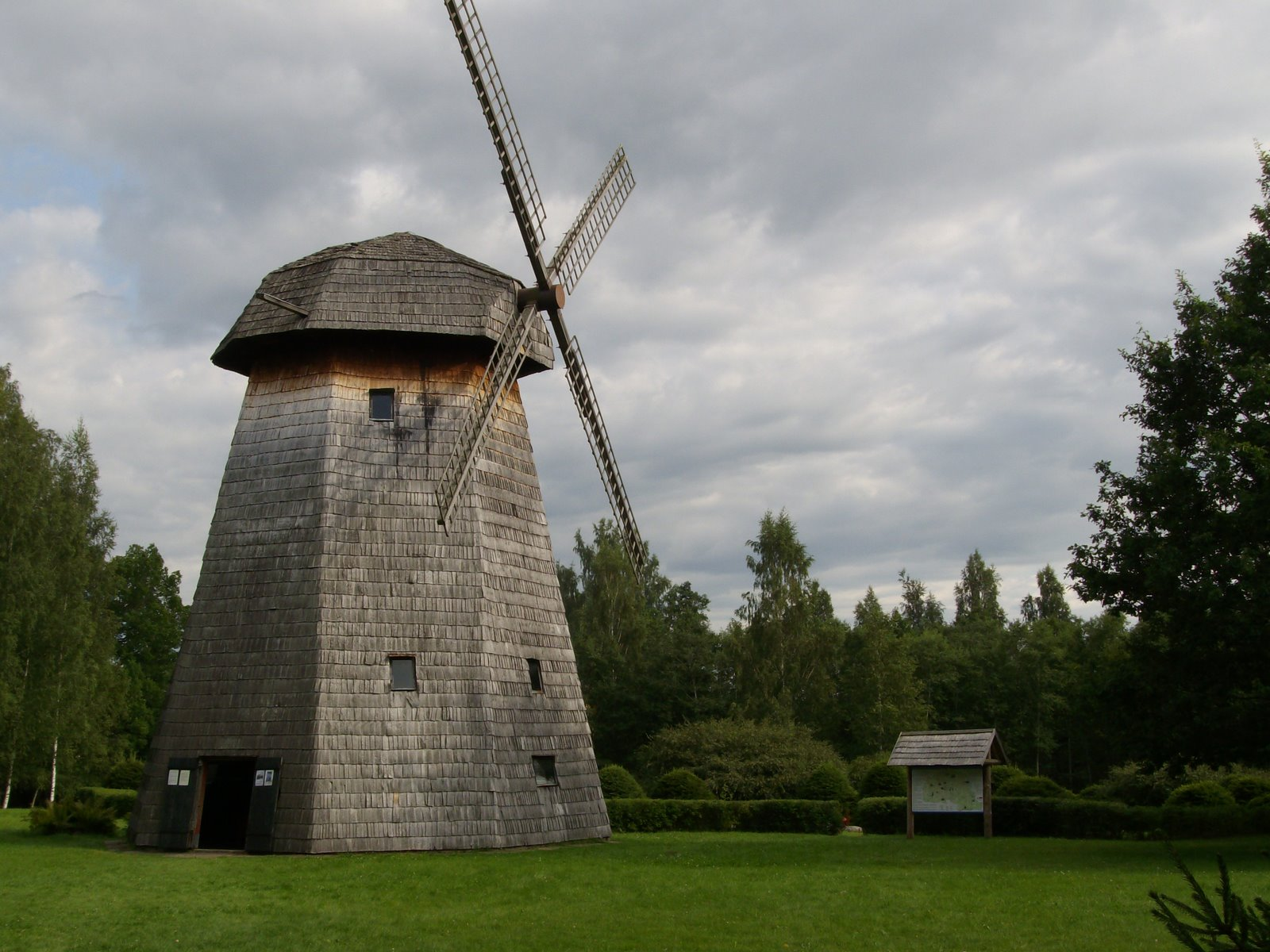
- Windmill in Prangli

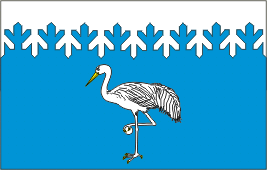
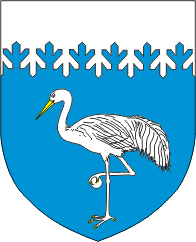
- Flag Coat of arms

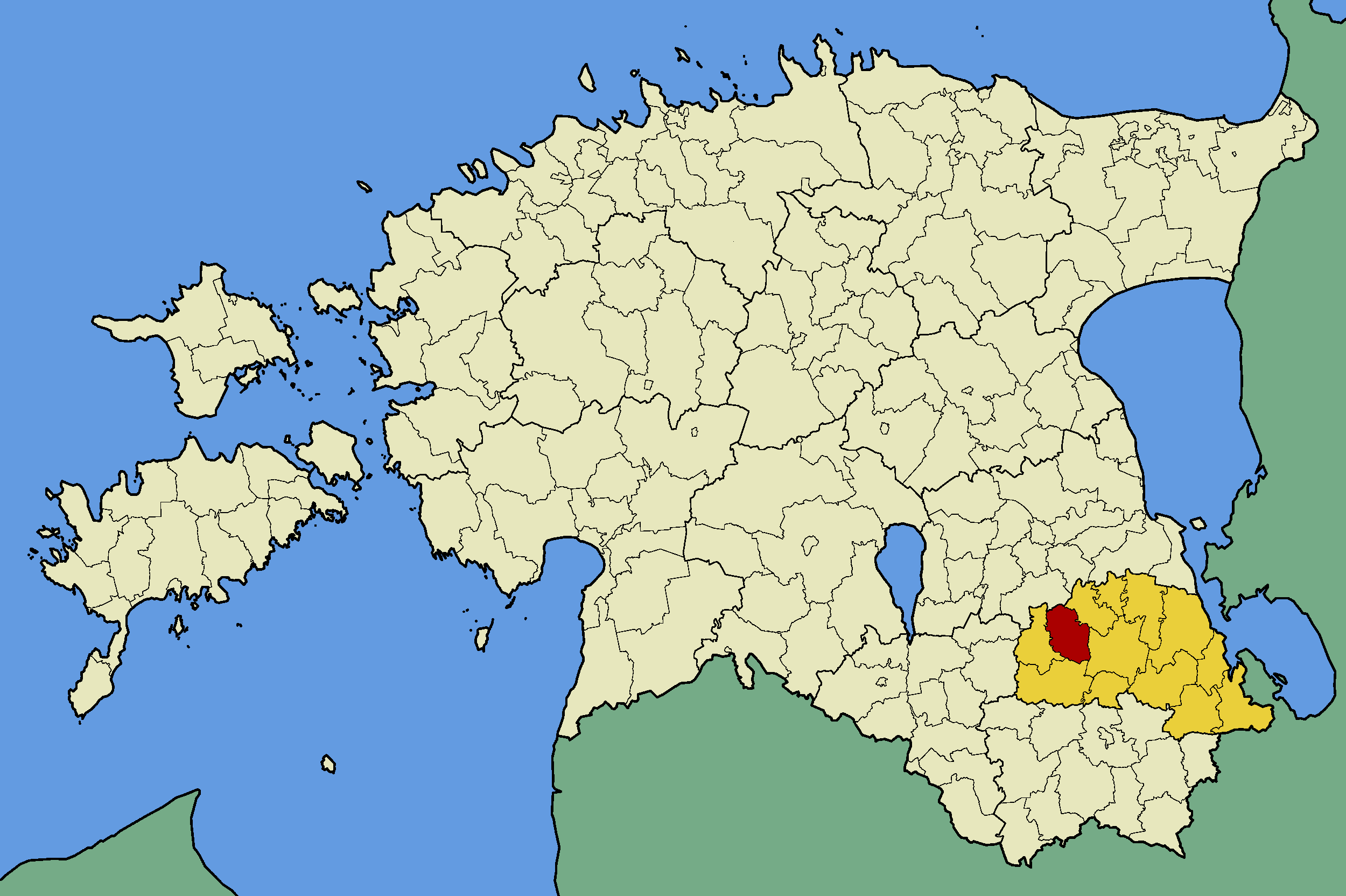
- Kõlleste Parish within Põlva County.
- Country: Estonia
- County: Põlva County
- Administrative centre: Krootuse

Area
  - Total: 150.42 km^{2} (58.08 sq mi)

Population (01.01.2009)
  - Total: 997
  - Density: 6.63/km^{2} (17.2/sq mi)
- Website: www.kolleste.ee

Kõlleste Parish (Estonian: Kõlleste vald; Võro: Kõllõstõ vald) was a rural municipality of Estonia, in Põlva County. It had a population of 997 (as of 1 January 2009) and an area of 150.42 km^{2} (58.08 sq mi).

== Villages ==
Häätaru - Ihamaru - Karaski - Karilatsi - Krootuse - Palutaja - Piigaste - Prangli - Tõdu - Tuulemäe - Veski - Voorepalu

== Visitor attractions ==
Põlva Peasant Museum is in Karilatsi village.
