= Lake Hilba =

Lake in Estonia

- Hilba järv (Estonian)
- Location within Estonia
- Coordinates: 58°03′43″N 26°51′48″E
- Basin countries: Estonia
- Max. length: 340 meters (1,120 ft)
- Surface area: 2.0 hectares (4.9 acres)
- Shore length^{1}: 810 meters (2,660 ft)
- Surface elevation: 91.5 meters (300 ft)
- ^{1} Shore length is not a well-defined measure.

Lake Hilba (Estonian: Hilba järv) is a lake in Estonia. It is located in the village of Ihamaru in Kanepi Parish, Põlva County.

== Physical description ==
The lake has an area of 2.0 hectares (4.9 acres). It is 340 meters (1,120 ft) long, and its shoreline measures 810 meters (2,660 ft). Hilba Creek (Estonian: Hilba oja) flows from the north end of the lake.

== Name ==
Lake Hilba is named after Hilba, a locality in Ihamaru and neighboring Krootuse, which is also the source of the names Hilba mägi 'Hilba Hill' southeast of the lake and Hilba veski 'Hilba Mill' at the northeast end of the lake. The name Hilba was attested in historical sources as Dorf Ilba in 1804 and Hibba in 1839. The name of the lake—as well as the hill, the former village of Hilba, and Hilba Creek—ultimately come from the Hilba Mill, believed to be derived from the first name Hilp (or Ilp) 'Philip'—thus 'Philip's Mill'.

== History ==
In 1943, the owner of the Hilba Mill at the outlet from the lake, Villu Treffner, was murdered. The murderer, Hans (a.k.a. Ants) Peitel, was sentenced to 12 years in prison. In 1948, it was determined that Lake Hilba supplied insufficient water to the mill during the winter, and the mill was converted to steam power.

== See also ==
- List of lakes of Estonia
