= Veski Nature Reserve =

Protected area in Estonia

- Location within Estonia
- Location: Estonia
- Coordinates: 58°07′32″N 26°47′13″E
- Area: 62 ha (150 acres)
- Established: 2001

Veski Nature Reserve is a nature reserve which is located in Põlva County, Estonia.

The area of the nature reserve is 62 ha.

The protected area was founded in 2001 to protect valuable habitat types and threatened species in Veski and Prangli village (both in former Kõlleste Parish).
