= Janokjärv =

Lake in Estonia

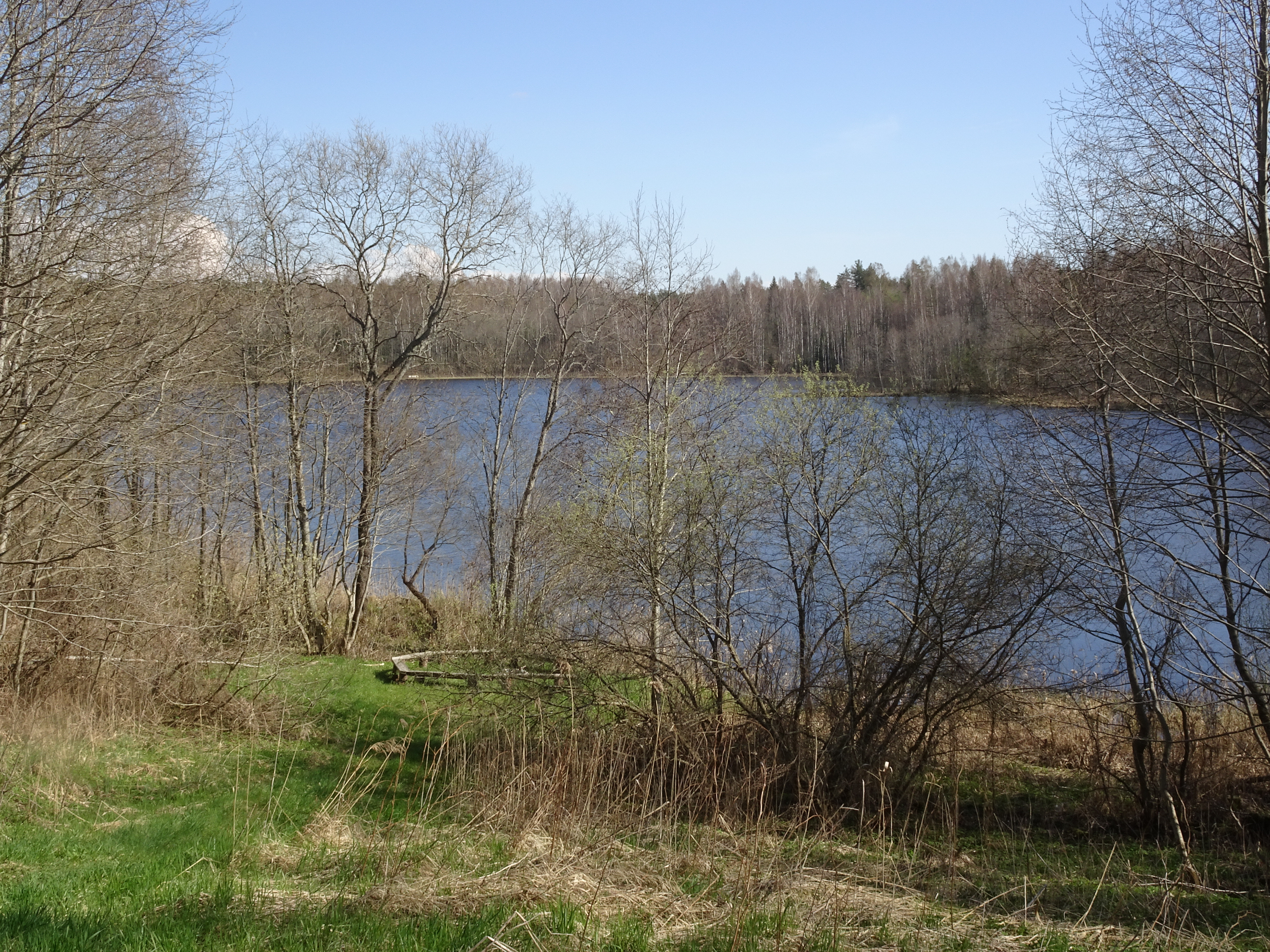

- Location within Estonia
- Coordinates: 58°05′52″N 26°50′41″E
- Basin countries: Estonia
- Max. length: 630 meters (2,070 ft)
- Surface area: 11.3 hectares (28 acres)
- Average depth: 3.7 meters (12 ft)
- Max. depth: 9.3 meters (31 ft)
- Shore length^{1}: 1,720 meters (5,640 ft)
- Surface elevation: 80.4 meters (264 ft)
- ^{1} Shore length is not a well-defined measure.

Janokjärv (also Jänukjärv, Jaanekjärv, or Janutjärv) is a lake in Estonia. It is located in the village of Piigaste in Kanepi Parish, Põlva County.

== Physical description ==
The lake has an area of 11.3 hectares (28 acres). The lake has an average depth of 3.7 meters (12 ft) and a maximum depth of 9.3 meters (31 ft). It is 630 meters (2,070 ft) long, and its shoreline measures 1,720 meters (5,640 ft). Piigaste Creek (Estonian: Piigaste oja or Piigastõ oja) flows through the lake.

== See also ==
- List of lakes of Estonia
