= Ihamaru Nature Reserve =

Protected area in Estonia

- Location within Estonia
- Location: Estonia
- Coordinates: 58°06′N 26°56′E
- Area: 255 ha (630 acres)
- Established: 1981 (2005)

Ihamaru Nature Reserve is a nature reserve located in Põlva County, Estonia.

The area of the nature reserve is 255 ha.

The protected area was founded in 1981 to protect the Ihamaru primeval forest. In 2005 the protected area was designated as a nature reserve.
