= Piigandi =

Piigandi may refer to several places in Estonia:

- Piigandi, Põlva County, village in Estonia
- Piigandi, Tartu County, village in Estonia
