= Rebaste, Põlva County =

Village in Estonia

Rebaste
- Village
- Location within Estonia
- Coordinates: 57.9417°N 26.6172°E
- Country: Estonia
- County: Põlva County
- Parish: Kanepi Parish
- Time zone: UTC+2 (EET)
  - Summer (DST): UTC+3 (EEST)

Rebaste is a village in Kanepi Parish, Põlva County in southeastern Estonia.

Lake Aalupi is located in Rebaste. The Pokuland (Estonian: Pokumaa) theme park is also located in the village.
