= Sulaoja =

Village in Põlva County, Estonia

Coordinates: 58°06′N 26°43′E

- Village
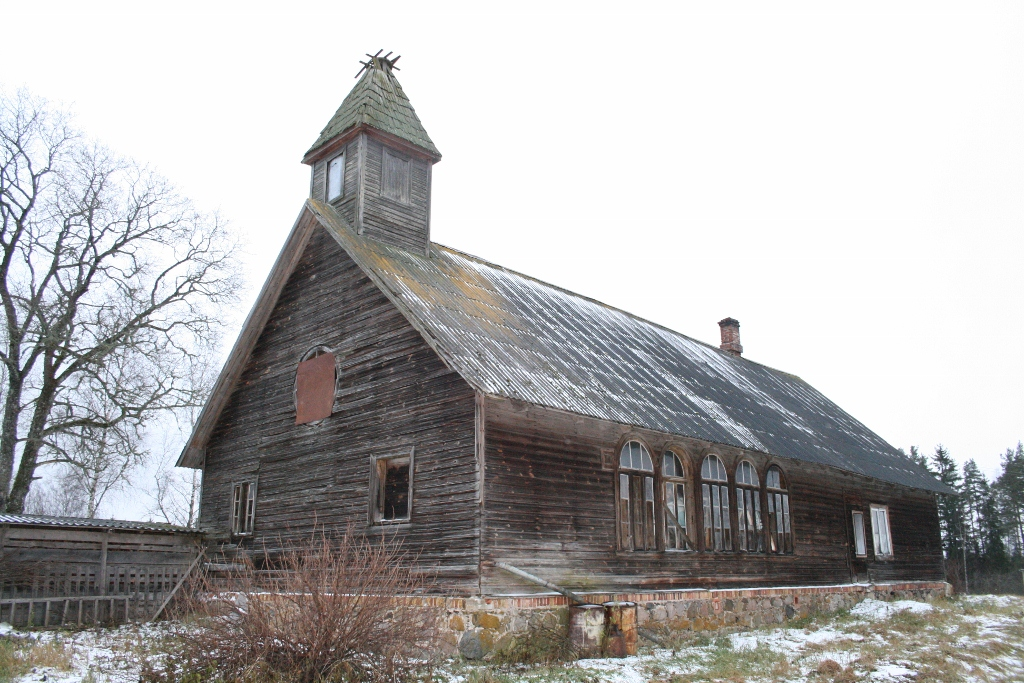
- Krüüdneri auxiliary church
- Interactive map of Sulaoja
- Country: Estonia
- County: Põlva County
- Parish: Kanepi Parish
- Time zone: UTC+2 (EET)
  - Summer (DST): UTC+3 (EEST)

Sulaoja (also: Sulaoja-Lullu) is a village in Kanepi Parish, Põlva County in southeastern Estonia. Prior to the 2017 administrative reform of Estonian local governments, the village belonged to Valgjärve Parish.
