= Vaher =

Family name

Vaher is an Estonian surname (meaning "maple"). Notable people with the surname include:

- Andreas Vaher (born 2004), Estonian footballer
- Anette Vaher (born 2007), Estonian rhythmic gymnast
- Ken-Marti Vaher (born 1974), Estonian politician
- Lembi Vaher (born 1987), Estonian pole vaulter
- Maret Vaher (born 1973), Estonian orienteer
- Reelika Vaher (born 1978), Estonian footballer
