= Heisri =

Village in Estonia

- Village
- Location within Estonia
- Coordinates: 58°02′N 26°47′E
- Country: Estonia
- County: Põlva County
- Parish: Kanepi Parish
- Time zone: UTC+2 (EET)
  - Summer (DST): UTC+3 (EEST)

Heisri is a village in Kanepi Parish, Põlva County in southeastern Estonia.
