= Edgar Valter =

Estonian writer and illustrator

- Born: 21 September 1929; Tallinn, Estonia
- Died: 4 March 2006 (aged 76)
- Occupations: Illustrator, writer, graphic artist, caricaturist
- Writing career
- Genre: Children's books
- Notable awards: Meie Mats

Edgar Valter (21 September 1929, Tallinn – 4 March 2006, Tartu) was an Estonian graphic artist, caricaturist, writer and illustrator of children's books, with over 250 books to his name, through 55 years of activity (1950–2005). His most famous work is Pokuraamat (The Poku Book).

== Life ==
Edgar Valter was born on 21 September 1929, in Tallinn, the fourth child of a family of eight children. He completed middle school in 1945, but did not graduate from secondary school.

He began working as a freelance artist in 1950, eventually illustrating some of the most famous Estonian children literature characters, including the Krõll, the Naksitrallid, the Sipsik, and the Kunksmoor. Edgar Valter illustrated over 250 books, most of them being books for children. His caricatures were published by many journals and newspapers. Edgar Valter worked for the magazines Hea Laps (a good kid), Täheke (a star), Pioneer, and Pikker (a humor and satire magazine published during Soviet times).

== Later life and death ==
Edgar Valter lived his last 15 years in the Pöörismäe farm, located at the Urvaste rural municipality of the Võrumaa County. He died on 4 March 2006. His remains were cremated and buried on 17 May 2006 at Metsakalmistu in Tallinn.

== The Poku Book and Pokus ==
First published in 1994, Pokuraamat (The Poku Book) tells the tale of Pokus. A poku is a grass mound that grows in southeastern Estonian bogs. In the book, Valter interprets pokus as animated childlike creatures, the grass actually being their golden head hair, which grows down to their feet. Its central theme is emphasizing the need to respect and to live in harmony with nature.

Pokuraamat was the first book that was both written and illustrated by Edgar Valter. In 1996, the book won the prestigious Nukits Competition award for best children's book of the year. Edgar Valter wrote two subsequent Poku-related books after that: Pokuaabits (The Poku ABC) (2002) and Pokulood (Poku Stories) (2004).

=== Pokuland ===
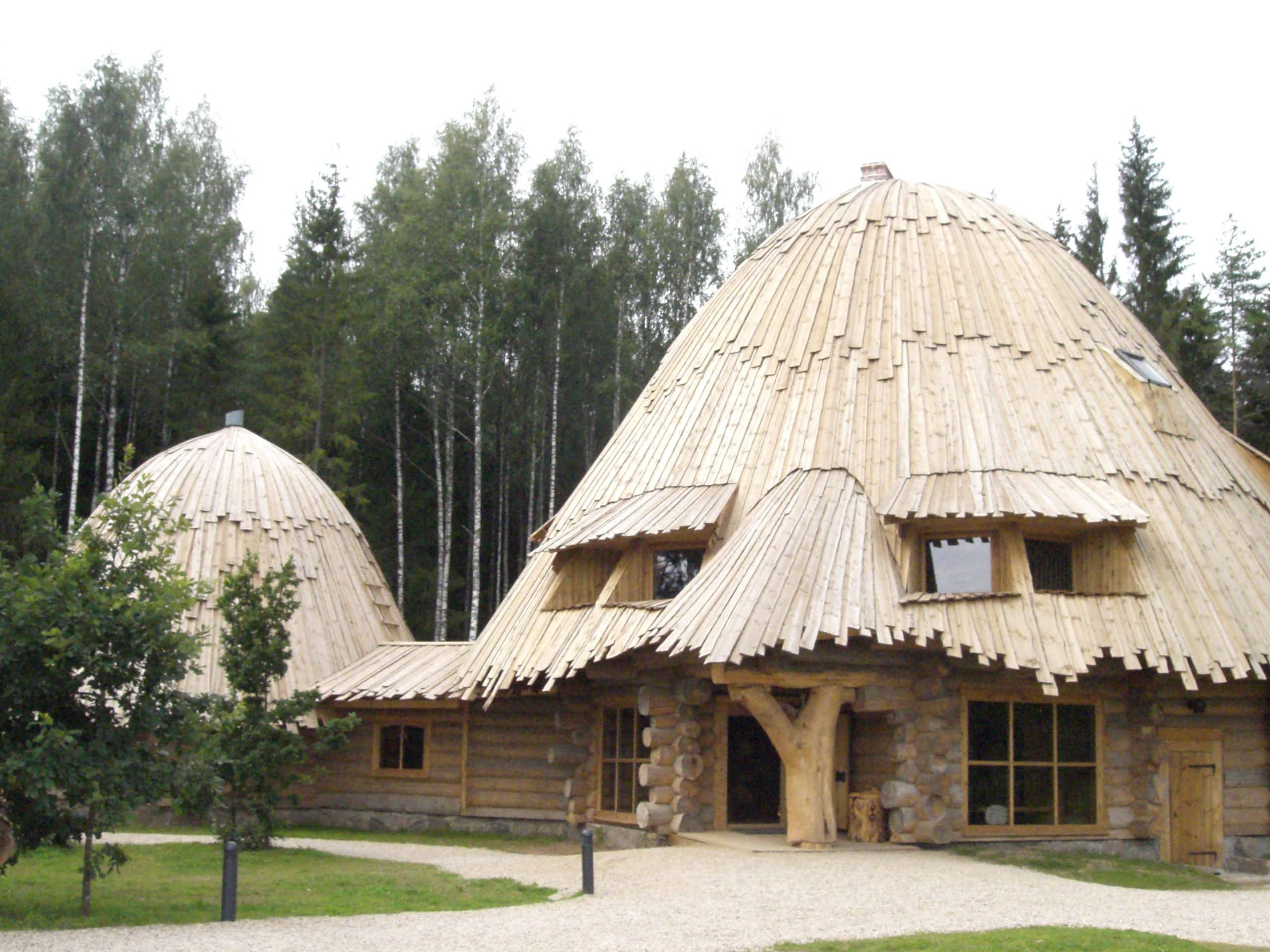
The Pokuhall in Pokuland, Kanepi Parish, Põlva County

Pokuland (Estonian: Pokumaa) is located in Rebaste (Kanepi Parish). Pokuland is a theme park where almost everything is related to Pokus.

== Bibliography ==
Selected titles

- Jahikoera memuaarid (1974; 2004)
- Pokuraamat (The Poku Book, 1994; 2001; 2005)
- Ahaa, kummitab (1995)
- Kassike ja kakuke (1995)
- Lugu lahkest lohe Justusest ja printses Miniminnist (The Story of the Nice Dragon Iustus and the Princess Minimin, 1995)
- Kullast vilepill (1996)
- Isand Tuutu ettevõtmised (1997)
- Iika (1998)
- Pintselsabad (The Brushtails, 1998)
- Metsa pühapäev (1999)
- Kuidas õppida vaatama? (How Can You Learn to See? 2000)
- Ho-ho-hoo! (2002)
- Pokuaabits (The Poku ABC, 2002)
- Natuke naljakad pildid (2003)
- Pokulood (Poku Stories, 2004)
- Ikka veel kummitab (2005)
- Maalid 1983–2005 (2007; 2022). Selected paintings.
- Karikatuurid läbi aegade (2011). Caricatures through time.
- Lasteraamatute illustratsioonid 1948–2005 (2014). Children book illustrations.

== Translations ==
Poku Stories

- Lithuanian: Puokių istorijos, 2014
- Udmurt: Пукейлэн мадёсъёсыз, 2010
- Polish: Opowieści Poku, 2026

The Poku Book

- Udmurt: Покъёс сярысь лыдзет, 2010
- Lithuanian: Puokiai, 2008
- Russian: Поки, 1995 (Таллинн); 2014 (Москва)
- Polish: Księga Poku, 2025

== Awards ==
- 1991 Meie Mats.
- 1995 Annual Children's Literature Award of the Cultural Endowment of Estonia (The Poku Book)
- 1996 Nukits Competition, 1st place for writing and illustrations (The Poku Book)
- 1996 Albu Parish's A. T. Tammsaare Award for Literature, special prize (The Poku Book)
- 2000 Nukits Competition, 2nd place (The Brushtails)
- 2001 The Estonian National Culture Foundation's award for lifetime achievement
- 2001 Order of the White Star, 3rd Class
- 2002 The Eerik Kumari Nature Conservation Award
- 2006 Nukits Competition, 2nd place (Poku Stories)
