= Jõgehara =

Village in Estonia

Coordinates: 57°57′N 26°40′E

- Village
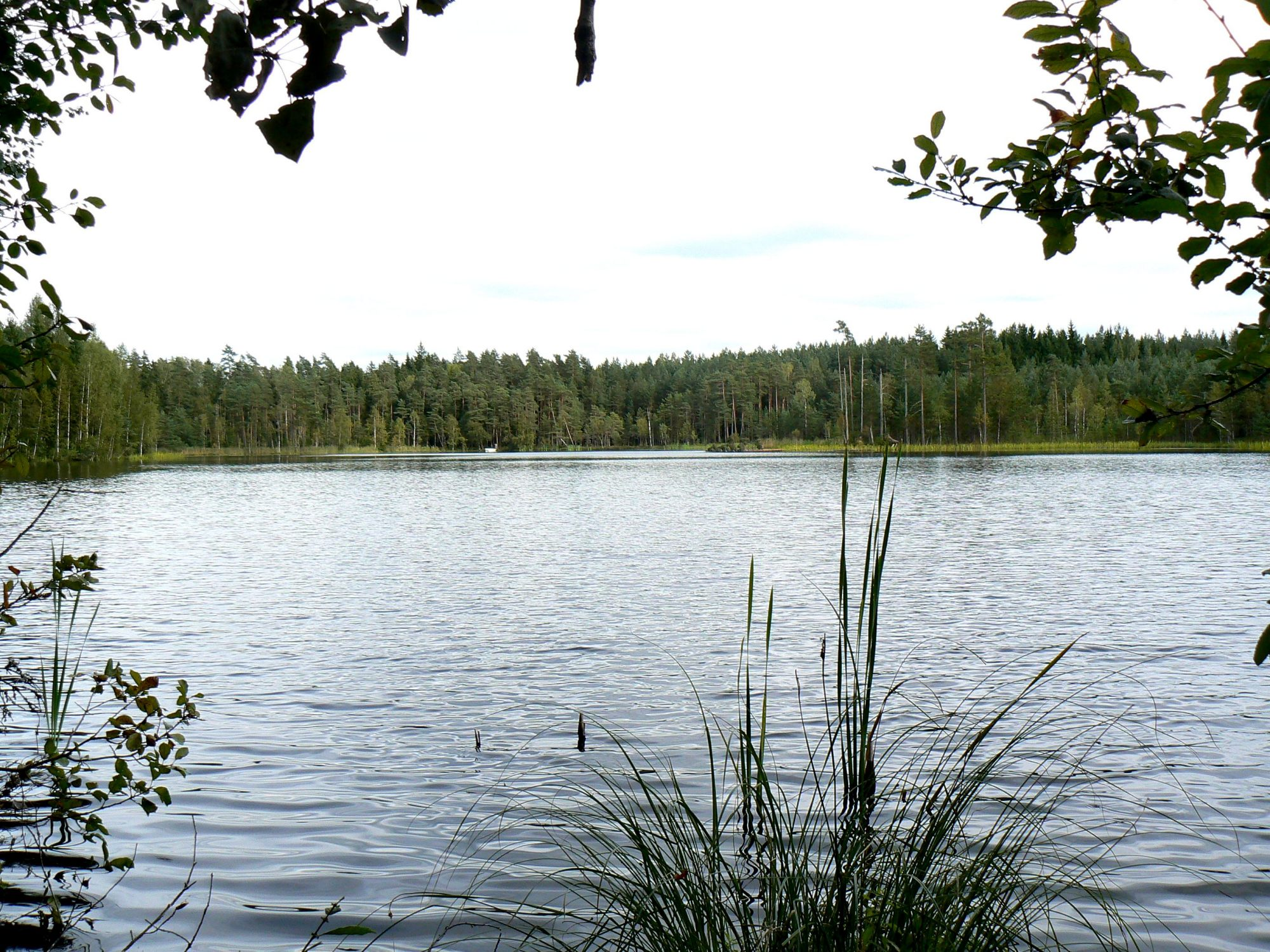
- Lake Hüüdre in Jõgehara
- Interactive map of Jõgehara
- Country: Estonia
- County: Põlva County
- Parish: Kanepi Parish
- Time zone: UTC+2 (EET)
  - Summer (DST): UTC+3 (EEST)

Jõgehara is a village in Kanepi Parish, Põlva County in southeastern Estonia.
