= Voorepalu =

Village in Estonia

Coordinates: 58°09′N 26°50′E

Voorepalu Voorõpalo
- Village
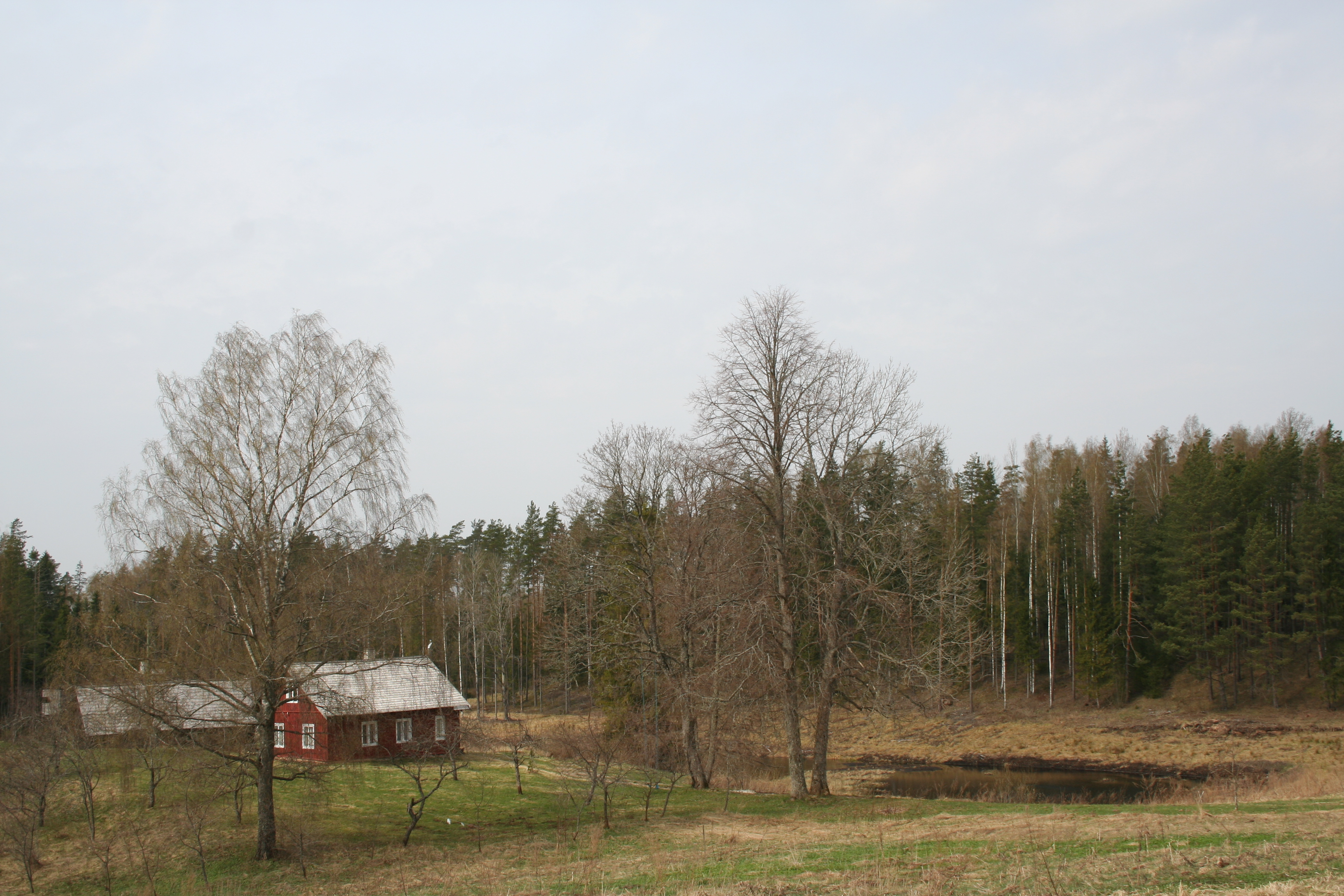
- Farm with pond in Voorepalu
- Interactive map of Voorepalu
- Country: Estonia
- County: Põlva County
- Parish: Kanepi Parish
- Time zone: UTC+2 (EET)
  - Summer (DST): UTC+3 (EEST)

Voorepalu (Võro: Voorõpalo) is a village in Kanepi Parish, Põlva County in southeastern Estonia. Prior to the 2017 administrative reform of Estonian local governments, the village belonged to Kõlleste Parish.

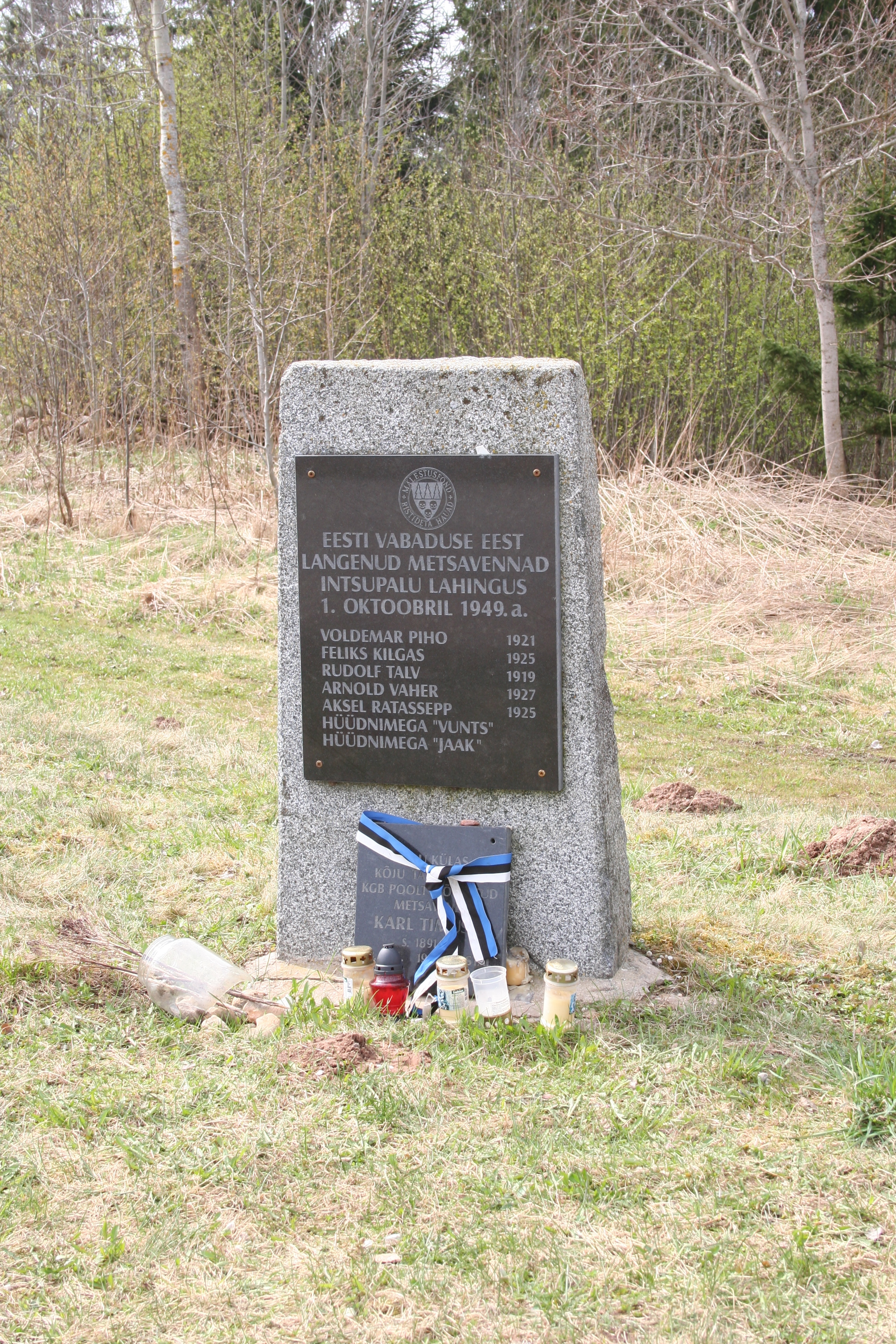
Memorial to local Forest Brothers who fought against the Soviets for the liberation of Estonia
