= Karilatsi =

Karilatsi may refer to several villages in Estonia:

- Karilatsi, Kanepi Parish, village in Kanepi Parish, Põlva County
- Karilatsi, Põlva Parish, village in Põlva Parish, Põlva County
