= Kaagvere, Põlva County =

Village in Estonia

Coordinates: 58°00′20″N 26°36′58″E

Kaagvere
- Village
- Interactive map of Kaagvere
- Country: Estonia
- County: Põlva County
- Parish: Kanepi Parish
- Time zone: UTC+2 (EET)
  - Summer (DST): UTC+3 (EEST)

Kaagvere is a village in Kanepi Parish, Põlva County in southeastern Estonia.
