= Lake Aalupi =

Lake in Estonia

- Aalupi järv (Estonian)
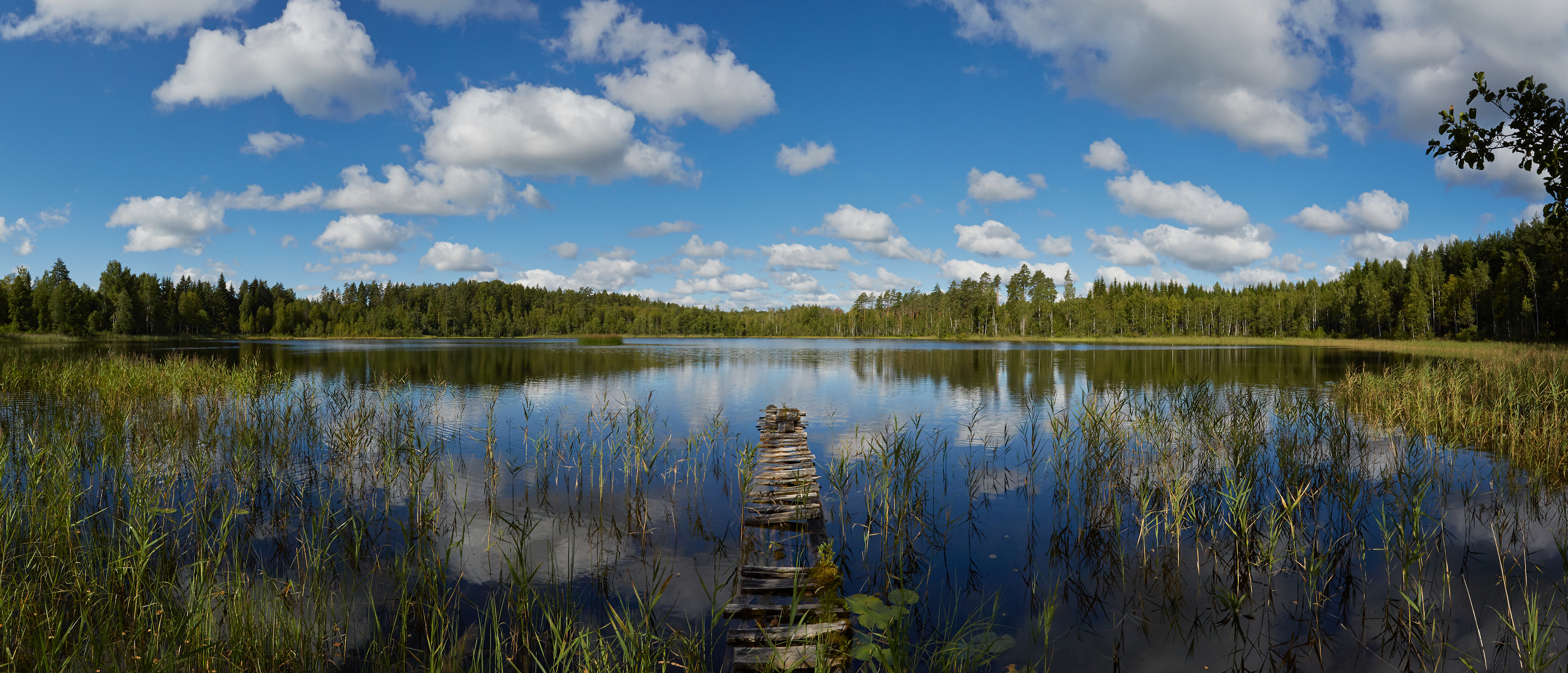
- Lake Aalupi in August 2013

- Location within Estonia
- Location: Rebaste, Kanepi Parish, Põlva County
- Coordinates: 57.958513°N 26.590975°E
- Primary outflows: Alopi Creek
- Basin countries: Estonia
- Max. length: 340 meters (1,120 ft)
- Surface area: 7.2 hectares (18 acres)
- Average depth: 6.5 meters (21 ft)
- Max. depth: 15.8 meters (52 ft)
- Water volume: 436,000 cubic meters (15,400,000 cu ft)
- Shore length^{1}: 1,040 m (3,410 ft)
- Surface elevation: 125.1 m (410 ft)
- ^{1} Shore length is not a well-defined measure.

Lake Aalupi (Estonian: Aalupi järv, also Alopi järv, Paabo järv, Alapea järv, or Paabu järv) is a lake in southeastern Estonia. It is located in the village of Rebaste, Kanepi Parish, Põlva County.

== Physical description ==
The lake has an area of 7.2 hectares (18 acres). The lake has an average depth of 6.5 meters (21 ft) and a maximum depth of 15.8 meters (52 ft). It is 340 meters (1,120 ft) long, and its shoreline measures 1,040 meters (3,410 ft). It has a volume of 436,000 cubic meters (15,400,000 cu ft). Its outflow is Alopi Creek (Alopi oja, a.k.a. Aalupi oja, Alopi kraav), which drains into Kärmase Pond (Kärmase tiik, a.k.a. Otitiik).

== See also ==
- List of lakes of Estonia
