= Tõdu =

Village in Estonia

- Village
- Location in Estonia
- Coordinates: 58°07′56″N 26°53′07″E
- Country: Estonia
- County: Põlva County
- Municipality: Kanepi Parish

Population (01.08.2007)
  - Total: 43

Tõdu is a village in Kanepi Parish, Põlva County in southeastern Estonia. It has a population of 43 (as of 1 August 2007).

Inside the Governorate of Livonia Tõdu belonged to historical Põlva Parish which was then part of Võru County. Tõdu knight manor (Tödwenshof) was located in the village.
