= Vissi, Põlva County =

Village in Estonia

Coordinates: 58°10′N 26°41′E

Vissi
- Village
- Interactive map of Vissi
- Country: Estonia
- County: Põlva County
- Parish: Kanepi Parish
- Time zone: UTC+2 (EET)
  - Summer (DST): UTC+3 (EEST)

Vissi is a village in Kanepi Parish, Põlva County in southeastern Estonia.
