= Hauka, Estonia =

Village in Estonia

Coordinates: 58°03′26″N 26°37′10″E

Hauka
- Village
- Interactive map of Hauka
- Country: Estonia
- County: Põlva County
- Parish: Kanepi Parish
- Time zone: UTC+2 (EET)
  - Summer (DST): UTC+3 (EEST)

Hauka is a village in Kanepi Parish, Põlva County in southeastern Estonia.
