= Pikajärve =

Village in Estonia

Coordinates: 58°04′N 26°35′E

- Village
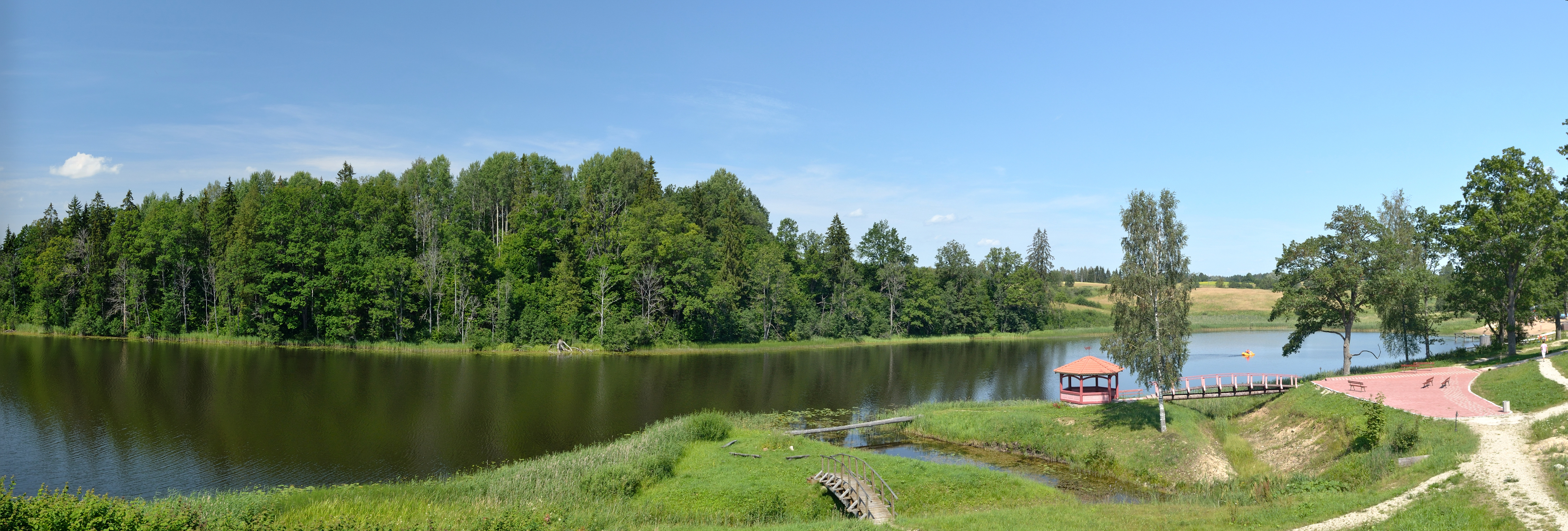
- Lake Pikajärv in the village
- Interactive map of Pikajärve
- Country: Estonia
- County: Põlva County
- Parish: Kanepi Parish
- Time zone: UTC+2 (EET)
  - Summer (DST): UTC+3 (EEST)

Pikajärve (German: Langensee) is a village in Kanepi Parish, Põlva County in southeastern Estonia.

Pikajärve has a locality called Kitse, which was formerly a separate village.

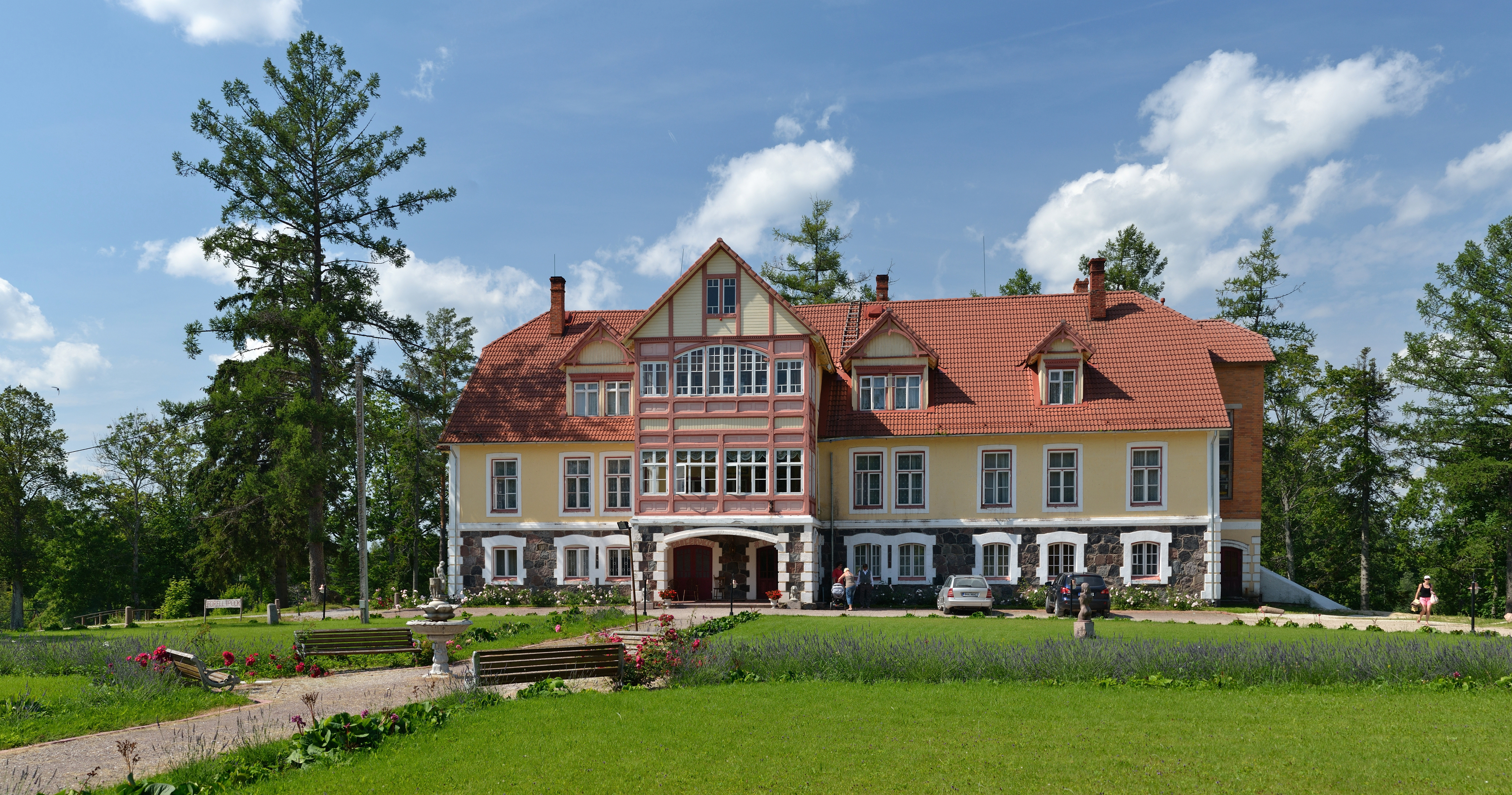
Pikajärve Manor
