= Aiaste =

Village in Estonia

- Village
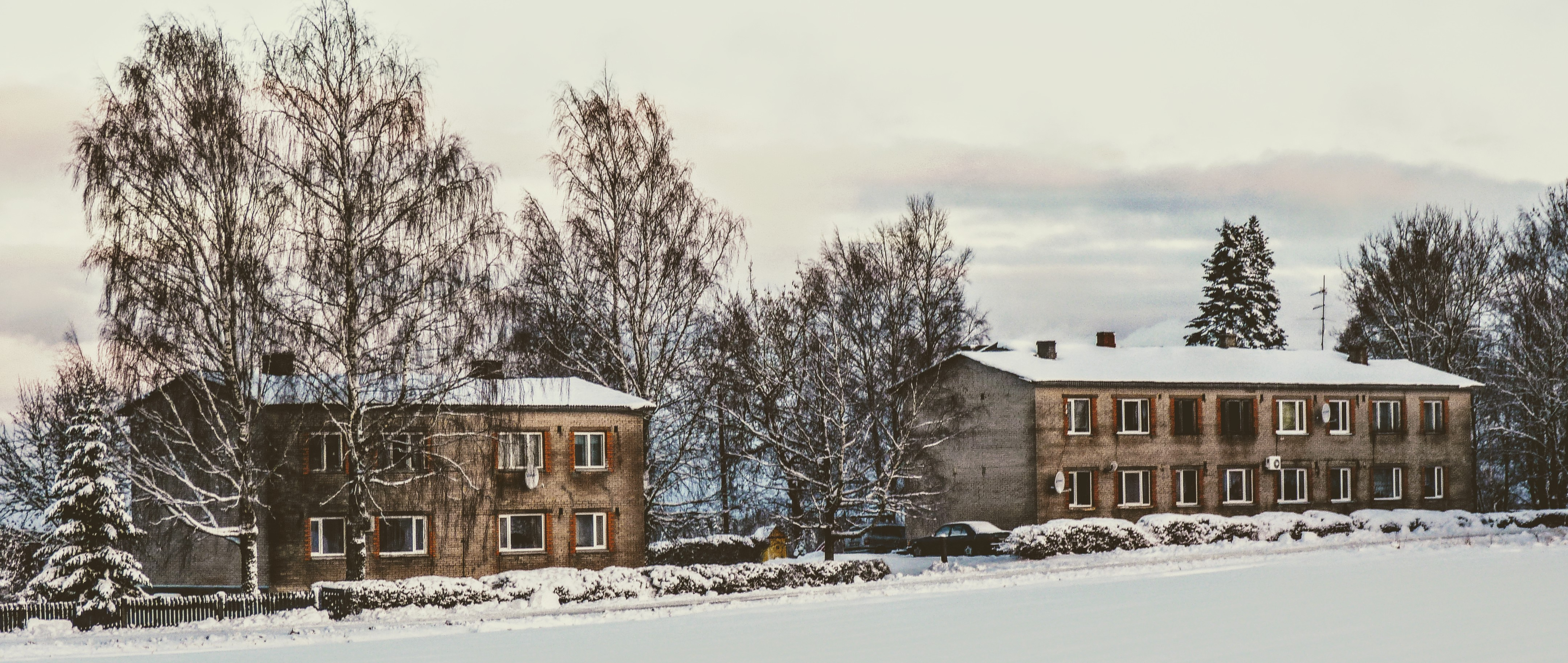

- Location in Estonia
- Coordinates: 58°03′N 26°39′E
- Country: Estonia
- County: Põlva County
- Parish: Kanepi Parish
- Time zone: UTC+2 (EET)
  - Summer (DST): UTC+3 (EEST)

Aiaste is a village in Kanepi Parish, Põlva County in southeastern Estonia.

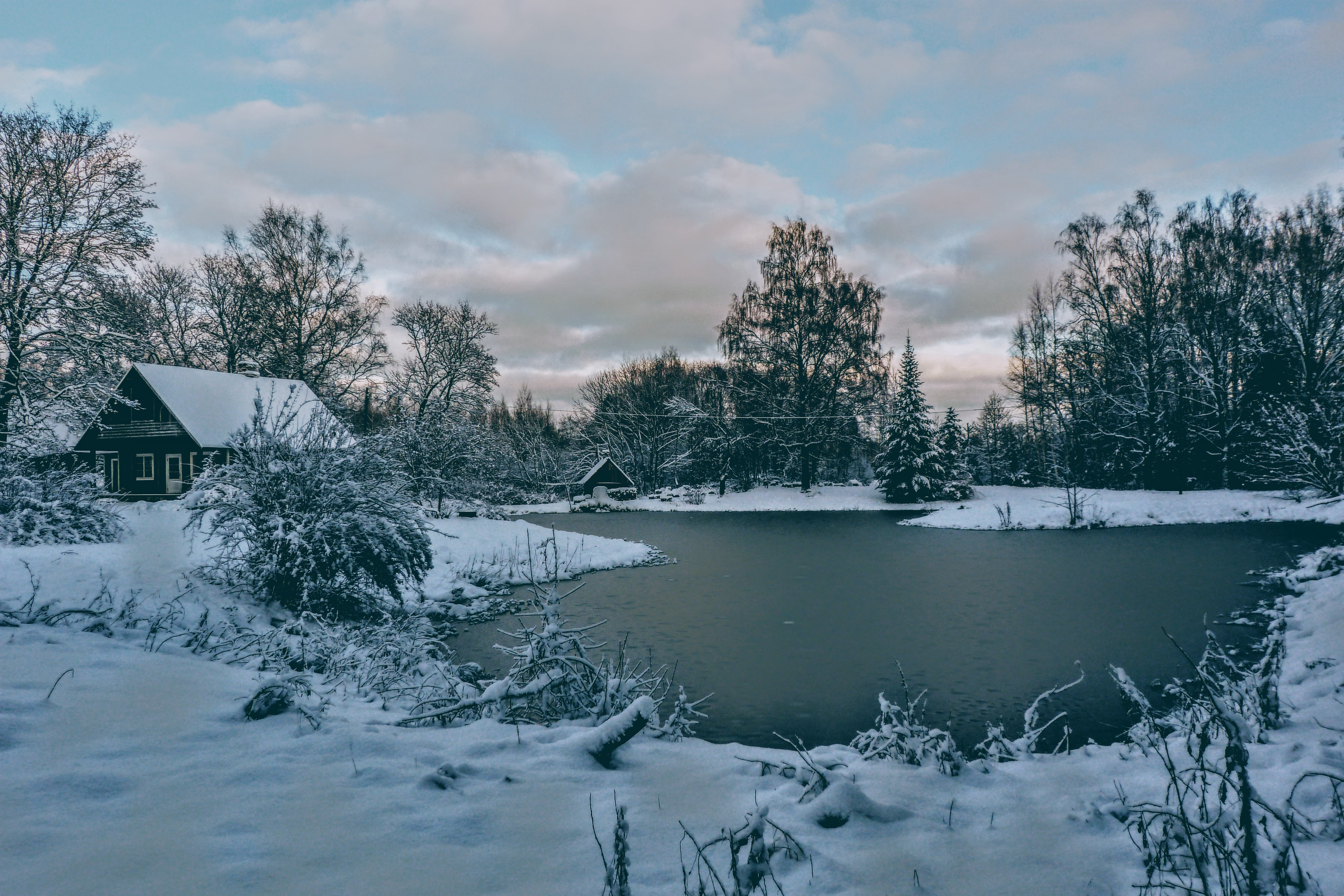
Summer house with a small lake in Aiaste
