= Piigandi, Põlva County =

Village in Estonia

Coordinates: 58°00′34″N 26°47′10″E

Piigandi
- Village
- Interactive map of Piigandi
- Country: Estonia
- County: Põlva County
- Parish: Kanepi Parish
- Time zone: UTC+2 (EET)
  - Summer (DST): UTC+3 (EEST)

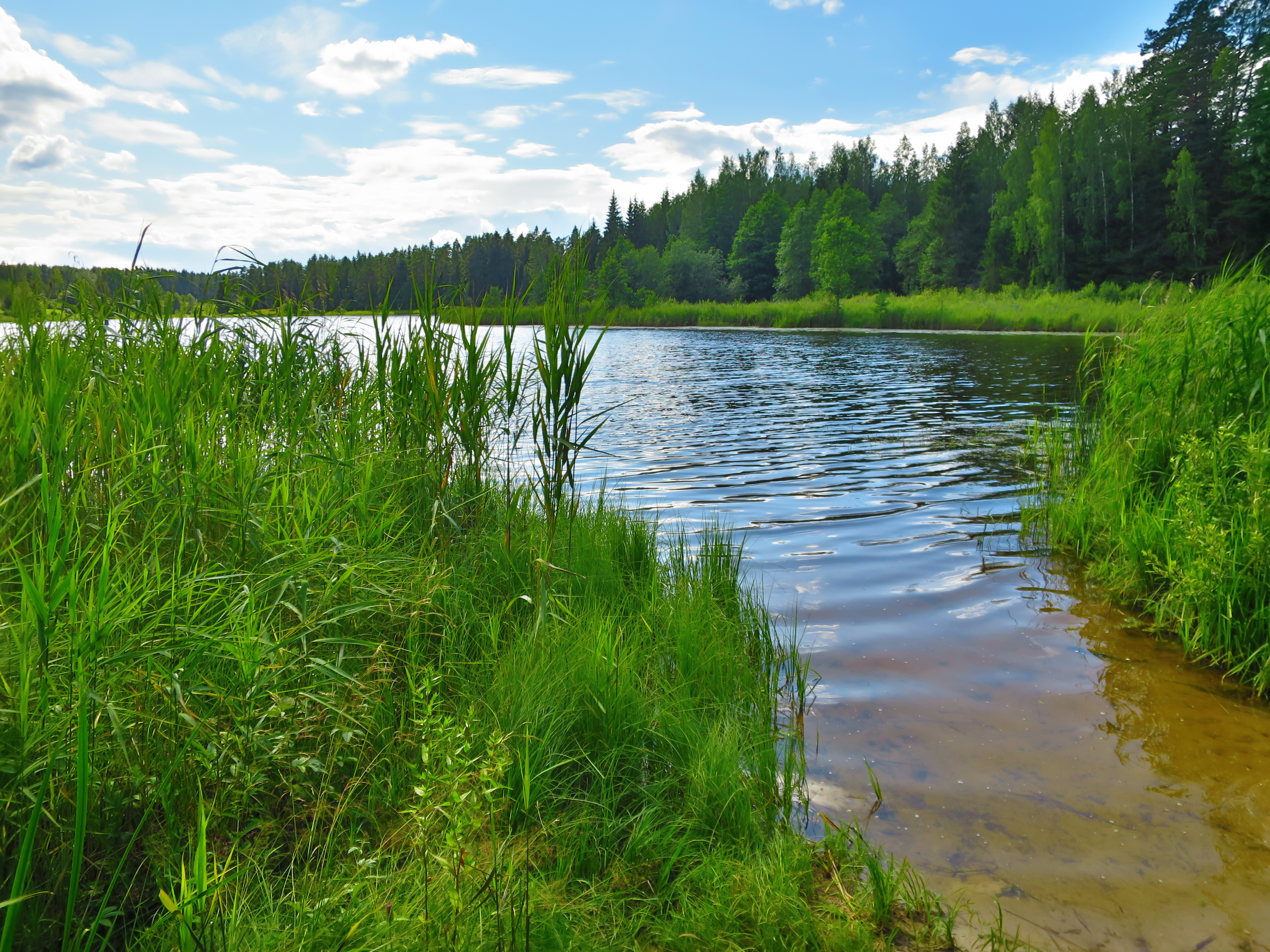
Piigandi

Piigandi is a village in Kanepi Parish, Põlva County in southeastern Estonia.
