= Lake Hüüdre =

Lake in Estonia

- Hüüdre järv (Estonian)
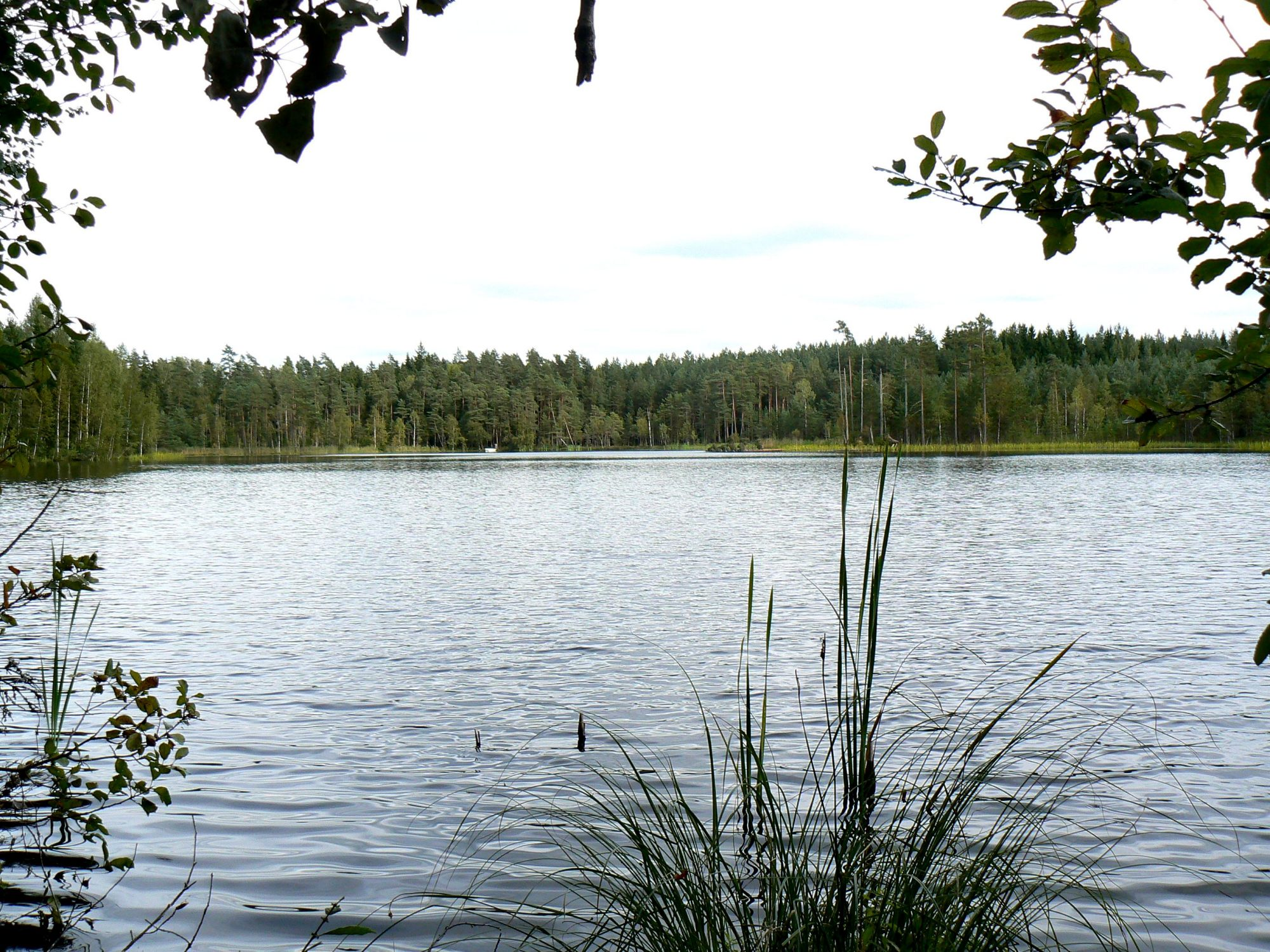

- Location within Estonia
- Coordinates: 57°56′25″N 26°40′26″E
- Basin countries: Estonia
- Max. length: 590 m (1,940 ft)
- Max. width: 125 m (410 ft)
- Surface area: 5.3 ha (13 acres)
- Surface elevation: 121.4 m (398 ft)

Lake Hüüdre (Estonian: Hüüdre järv, also Hüüdra järv) is a lake located in the Otepää Uplands in the village of Jõgehara, Kanepi Parish, Põlva County, Estonia.

Lake Hüüdre is an elongated lake oriented in the east–west direction. It measures 590 meters in length, 125 meters in width, and covers an area of 5.3 hectares. Situated in a forested area within a gentle depression, the lake features steep and gravelly shores on its north side. On the west side of which begins a small swampy area. On the southwest side there is a corner community of seven houses. Forestry roads run on different sides of the lake, although none of them go all the way to the shore. The shores of the lake are sandy. The lake is considered part of the Pühajõgi drainage basin.

According to the classification of the Water Framework Directive, Lake Hüüdre is categorized as a soft-water lake with a pale water color. Limnologically, it is classified as both a soft-water lake and a mixotrophic lake. The lime content of the water is low, but at the same time its nutrient content and humus composition are high.

There are about 16 species of aquatic plants in the lake. In 1972, there were more abundant water plants, for example Acorus calamus, Carex, Phragmites australis, Calla, Typha, Menyanthes, and the non-native Elodea canadensis. Among the floating plants, there was more abundant Nuphar and Sparganium gramineum.

Several fish species are found in the lake, including sunbleak, Crucian carp, and European perch.

== See also ==
- List of lakes of Estonia
