= Heino Sisask =

Estonian politician and sportsperson (1928–2023)

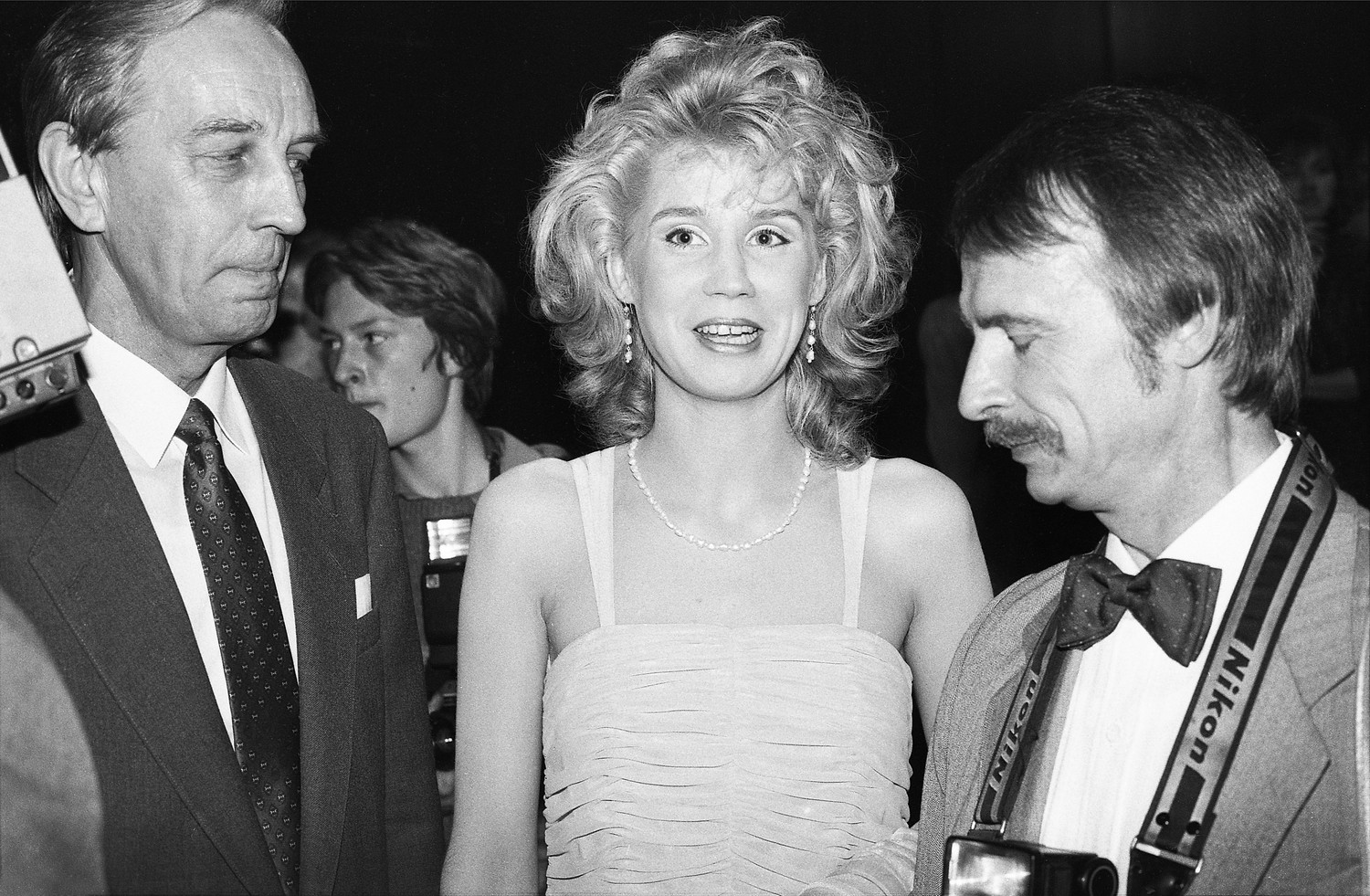
Sisask (left), Heli Mets and Mati Hiis in 1988

Heino Sisask (31 December 1928 – 21 January 2023) was an Estonian politician, racewalker, and sports personality.

He was born in Sirvaste, Tartu County. In 1952 he graduated from Tartu State University's Faculty of Law.

He started his athletics exercising under the guidance of Valter Kalam. He focused on race walking. He was two-times Estonian champion in race walking. From 1950 to 1952 he was a member of Estonian national athletics team.

From 1957 to 1964 he served in the Executive Committee of the City of Tartu, including as deputy chair and head chair. From 1964 to 1974 he was the chairman of Estonian SSR Sport Committee. From 1964 to 1974 he was a member of Soviet Union's Olympic Committee. From 1984 to 1995 he was a chairman of Estonian Gymnastics Federation, and from 1995 to 2001 its vice-president. From 1992 to 1999 he was a member of Estonian Olympic Committee.
