= Sirvaste =

Village in Estonia

Coordinates: 58°02′N 26°43′E

- Village
- Interactive map of Sirvaste
- Country: Estonia
- County: Põlva County
- Parish: Kanepi Parish
- Time zone: UTC+2 (EET)
  - Summer (DST): UTC+3 (EEST)

Sirvaste is a village in Kanepi Parish, Põlva County in southeastern Estonia.
