= Karilatsi, Kanepi Parish =

Village in Estonia

Karilatsi
- Village
- Location in Estonia
- Coordinates: 58°07′20″N 26°55′20″E
- Country: Estonia
- County: Põlva County
- Municipality: Kanepi Parish

Population (2011 Census)
  - Total: 61

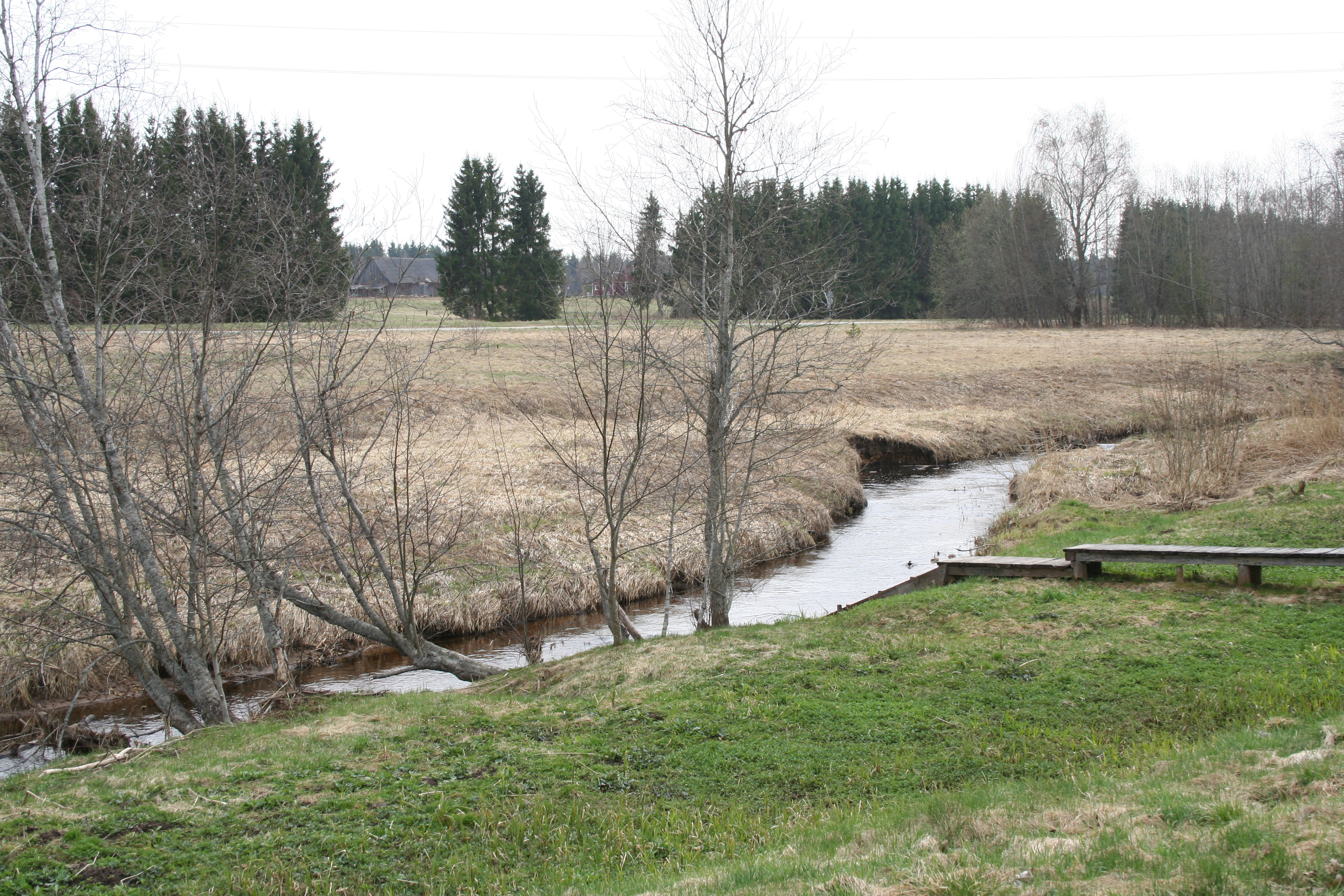
Piigaste Stream in Karilatsi, Põlva County.

Karilatsi is a village in Kanepi Parish, Põlva County in southeastern Estonia. It is located about 10 km (6 mi) northwest of the town of Põlva and about 30 km (19 mi) southeast of the city of Tartu.

As of the 2011 census, the settlement's population was 61.

Karilatsi is home to the Põlva Peasant Museum, established in 1972.
