= Veski, Põlva County =

Village in Estonia

Coordinates: 58°06′N 26°45′E

Veski
- Village
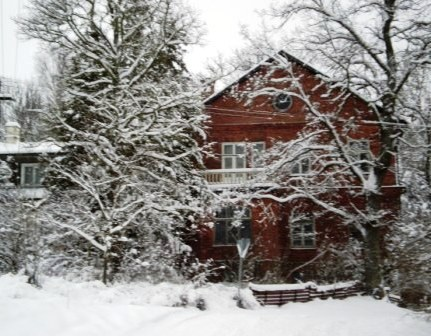
- Veski Manor
- Interactive map of Veski
- Country: Estonia
- County: Põlva County
- Parish: Kanepi Parish
- Time zone: UTC+2 (EET)
  - Summer (DST): UTC+3 (EEST)

Veski is a village in Kanepi Parish, Põlva County in southeastern Estonia.
