= Maret Vaher =

Estonian orienteer (born 1973)

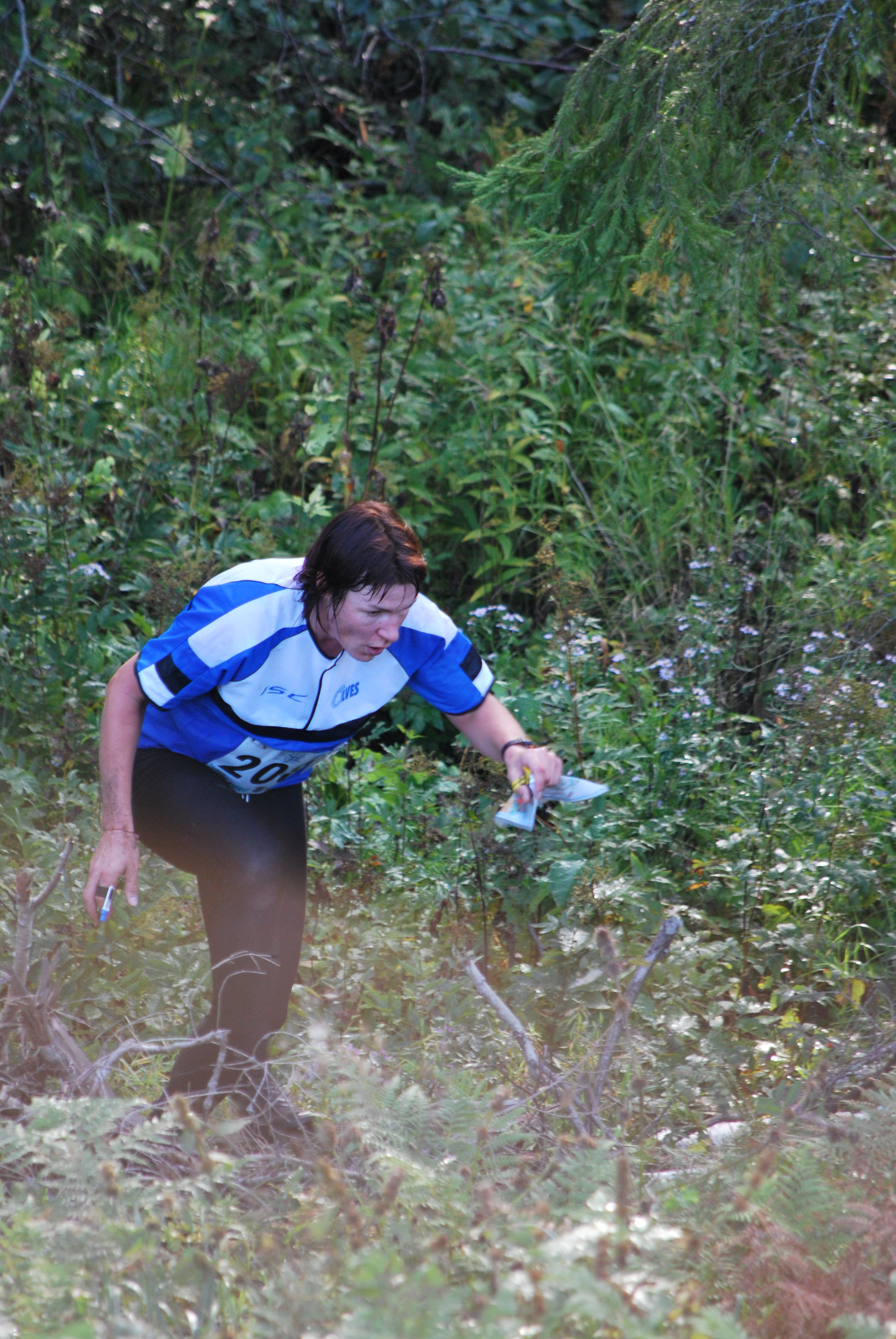
- Maret Vaher orienteering in 2009

Medal record

Representing Estonia

Women's ski orienteering

World Championships
Bronze medal – third place	1994	Long

Maret Vaher (born 12 January 1973 in Saverna) is an Estonian orienteer. She competed at the 1994 World Ski Orienteering Championships in Val di Non, where she won a bronze medal in the long distance, and placed 7th in the relay with the Estonian team.

== See also ==
- List of orienteers
