= Prangli, Põlva County =

Village in Estonia

Coordinates: 58°10′N 26°47′E

Prangli
- Village
- Interactive map of Prangli
- Country: Estonia
- County: Põlva County
- Parish: Kanepi Parish
- Time zone: UTC+2 (EET)
  - Summer (DST): UTC+3 (EEST)

Prangli is a village in Kanepi Parish, Põlva County, in southeastern Estonia.

The painter Julie Wilhelmine Hagen-Schwarz (1824–1902) was born in Prangli.
