= Saverna =

Village in Estonia

Coordinates: 58°04′N 26°43′E

- Village
- Interactive map of Saverna
- Country: Estonia
- County: Põlva County
- Parish: Kanepi Parish
- Time zone: UTC+2 (EET)
  - Summer (DST): UTC+3 (EEST)

Saverna (German: Sawwern) is a village in Kanepi Parish, Põlva County in southeastern Estonia.

The orienteer Maret Vaher (born 1973) was born in Saverna.

== Gallery ==
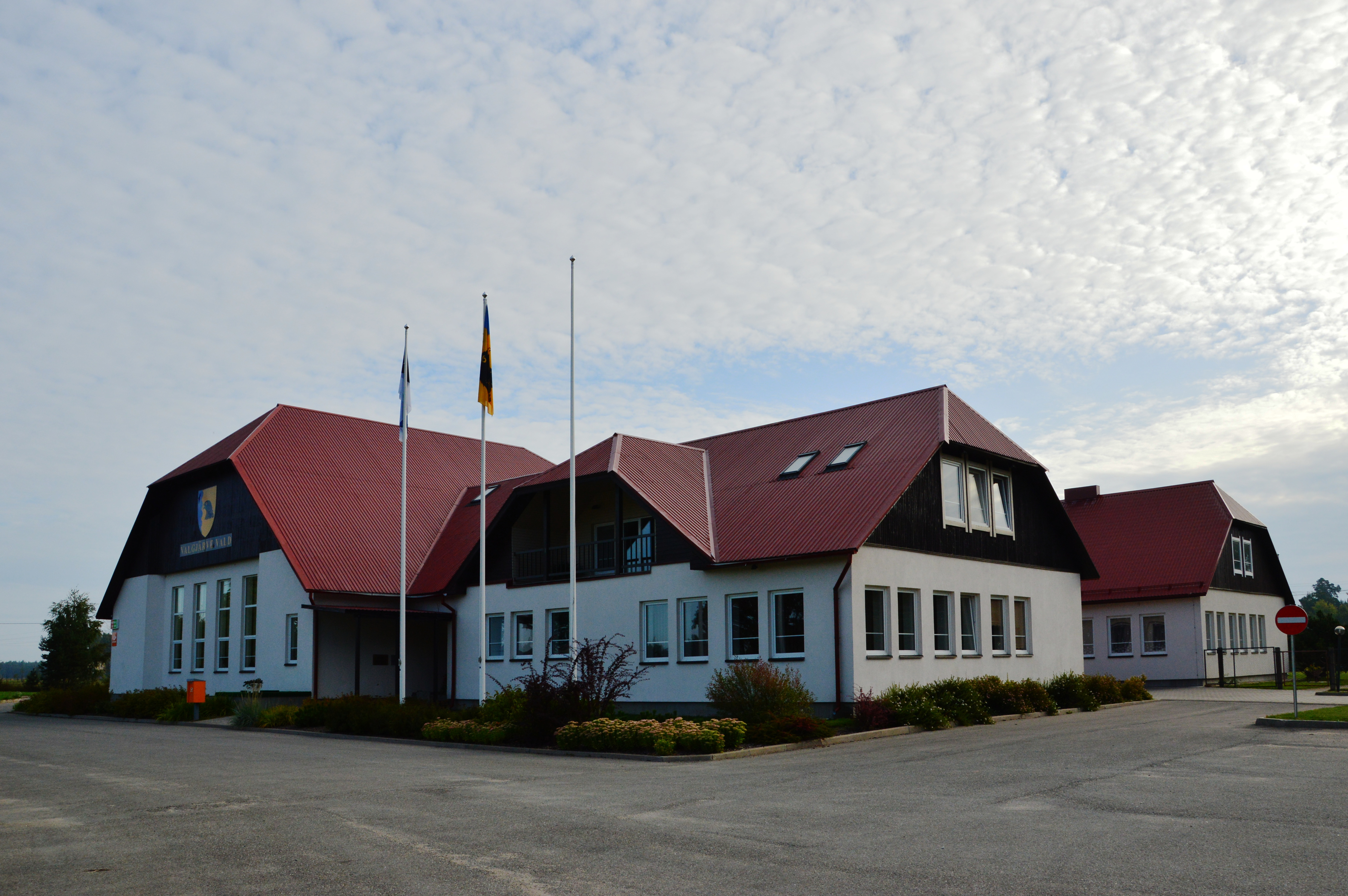

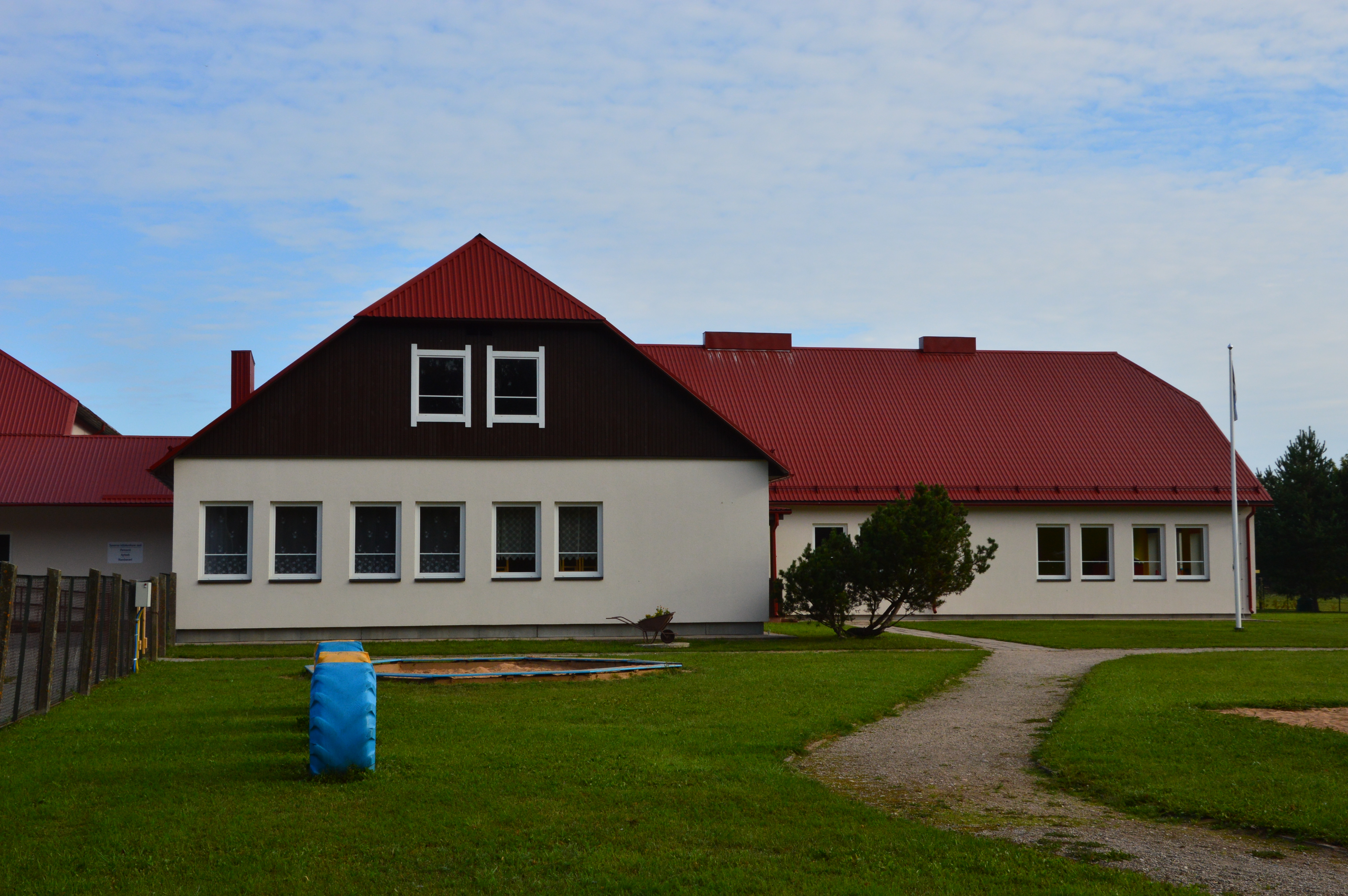

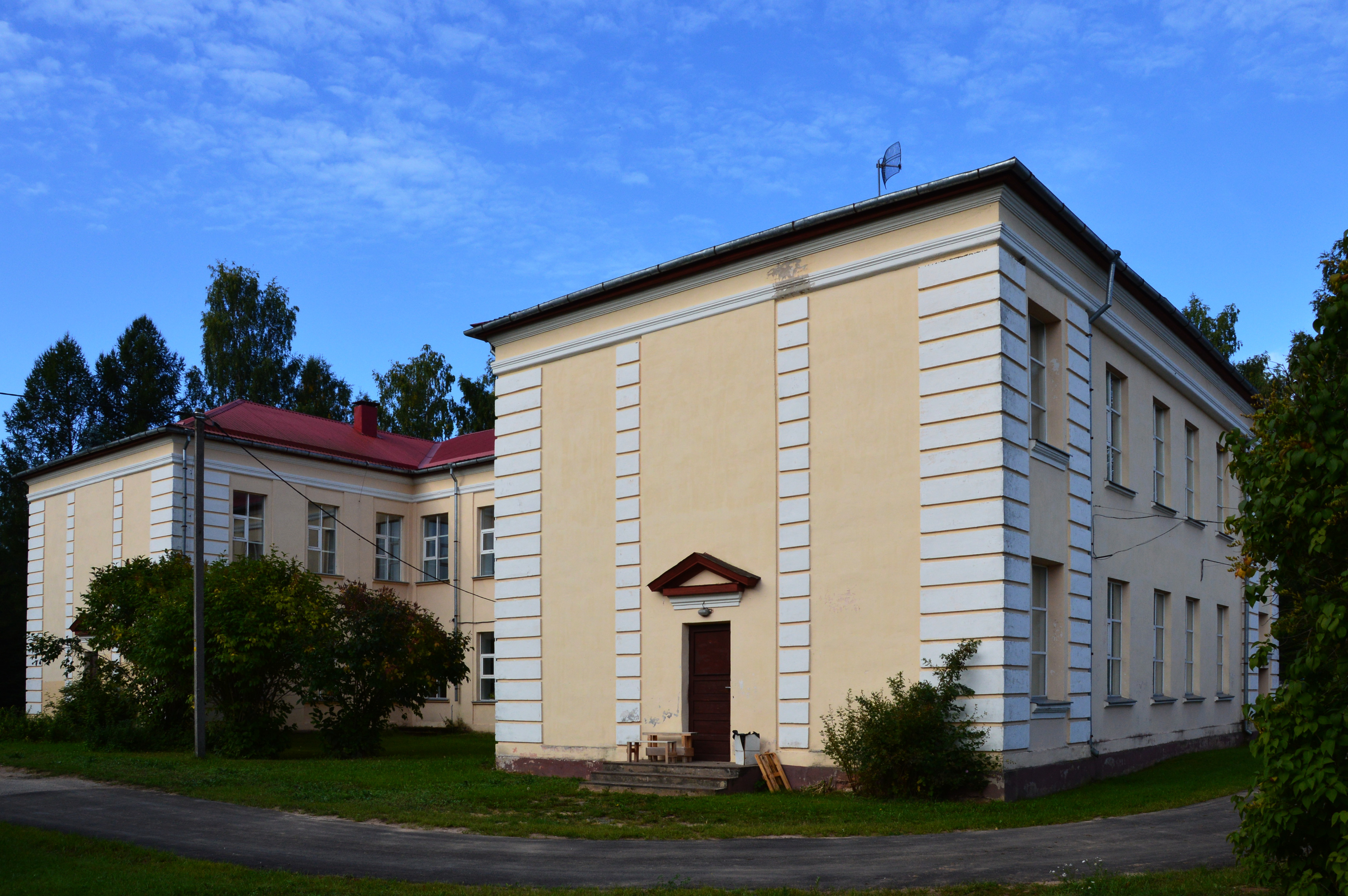

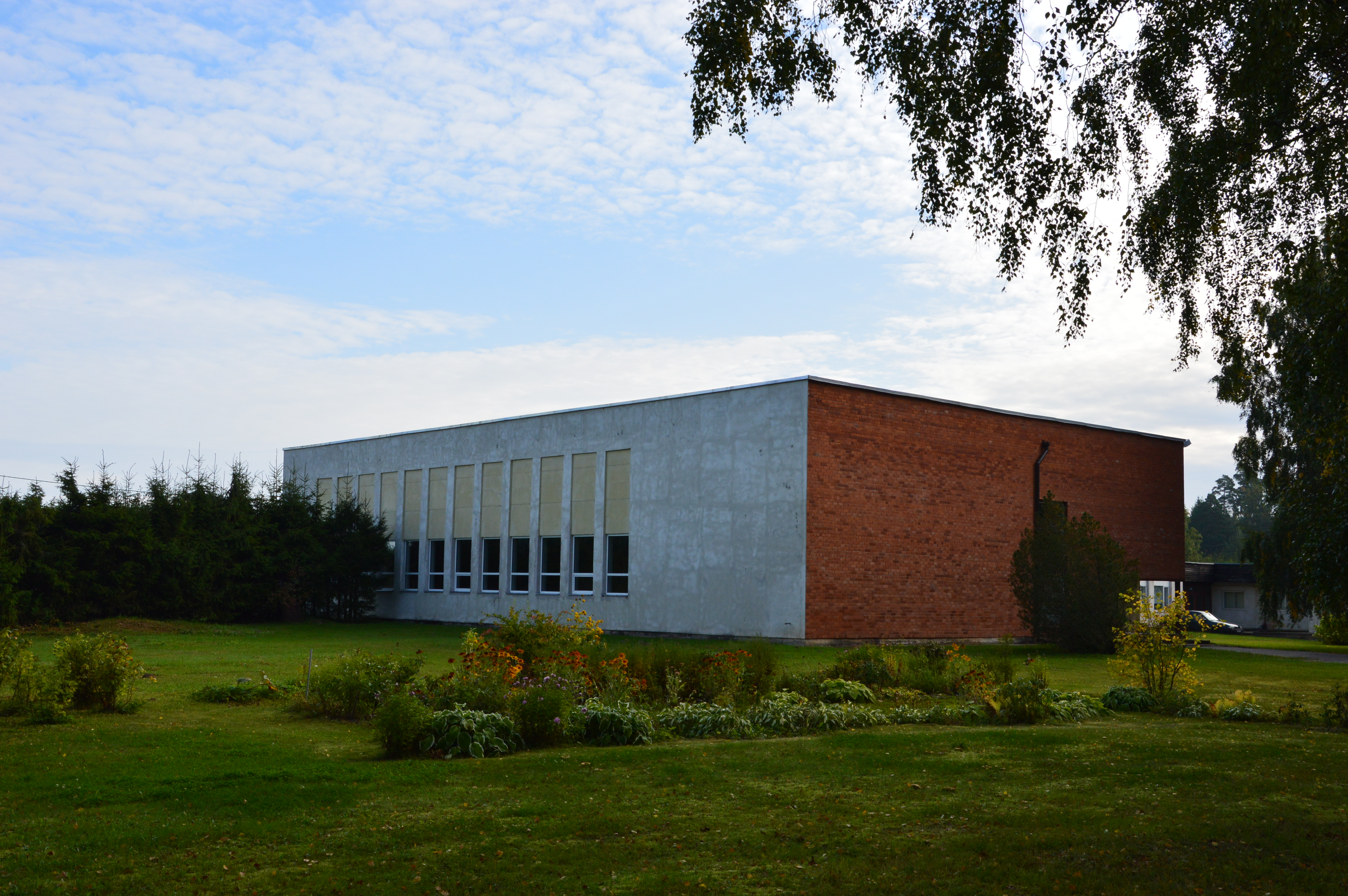
