= Krootuse =

Village in Estonia

Coordinates: 58°04′N 26°50′E

- Village
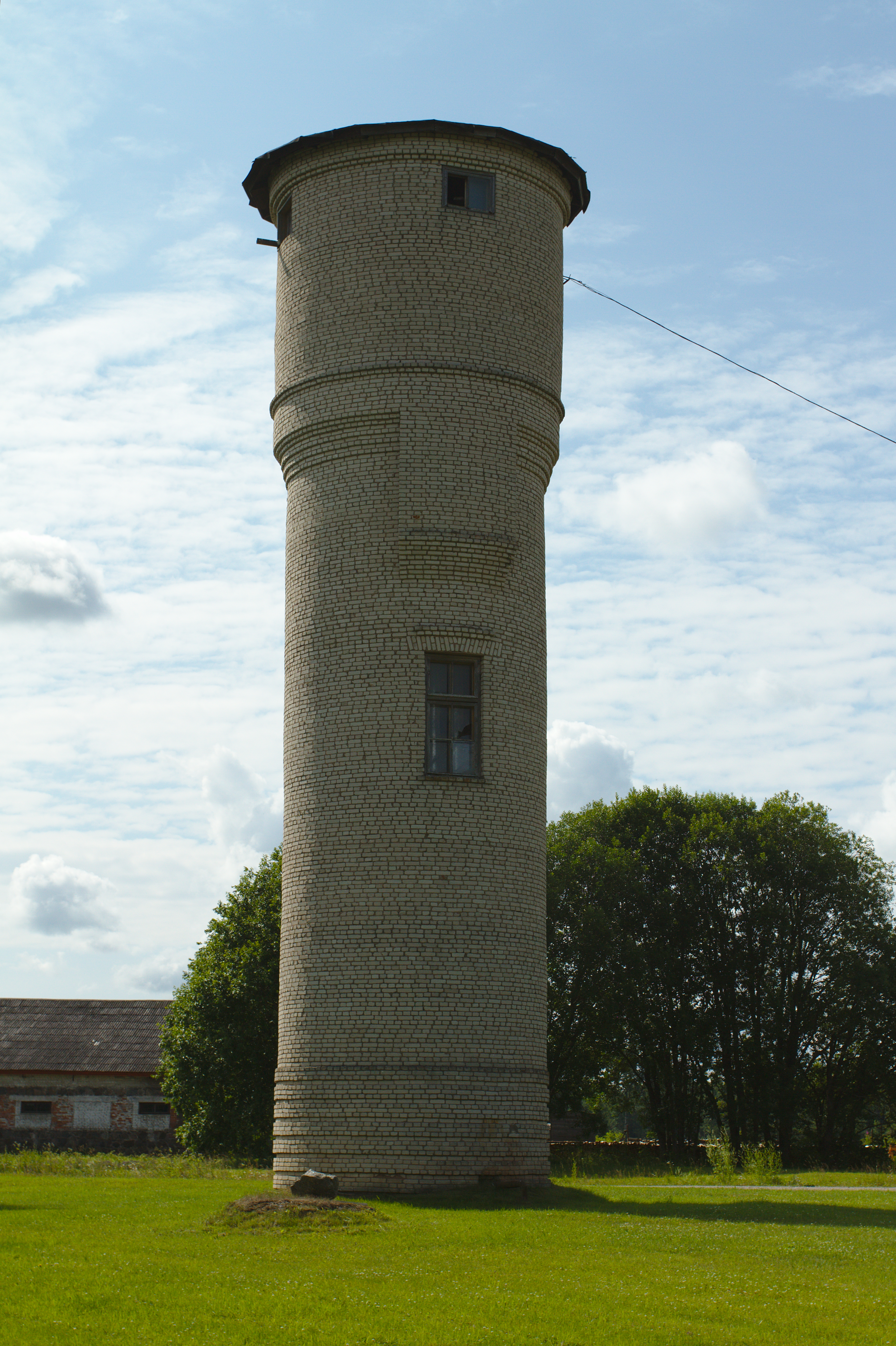
- Krootuse water tower
- Interactive map of Krootuse
- Country: Estonia
- County: Põlva County
- Parish: Kanepi Parish
- Time zone: UTC+2 (EET)
  - Summer (DST): UTC+3 (EEST)

Krootuse is a village in Kanepi Parish, Põlva County in southeastern Estonia.

The politician Heinrich Mark (1911–2004) was born in Krootuse.
