= Kanepi Parish =

Municipality of Estonia

Coordinates: 57°59′8″N 26°45′34″E

Kanepi Parish Kanepi vald
- Municipality of Estonia
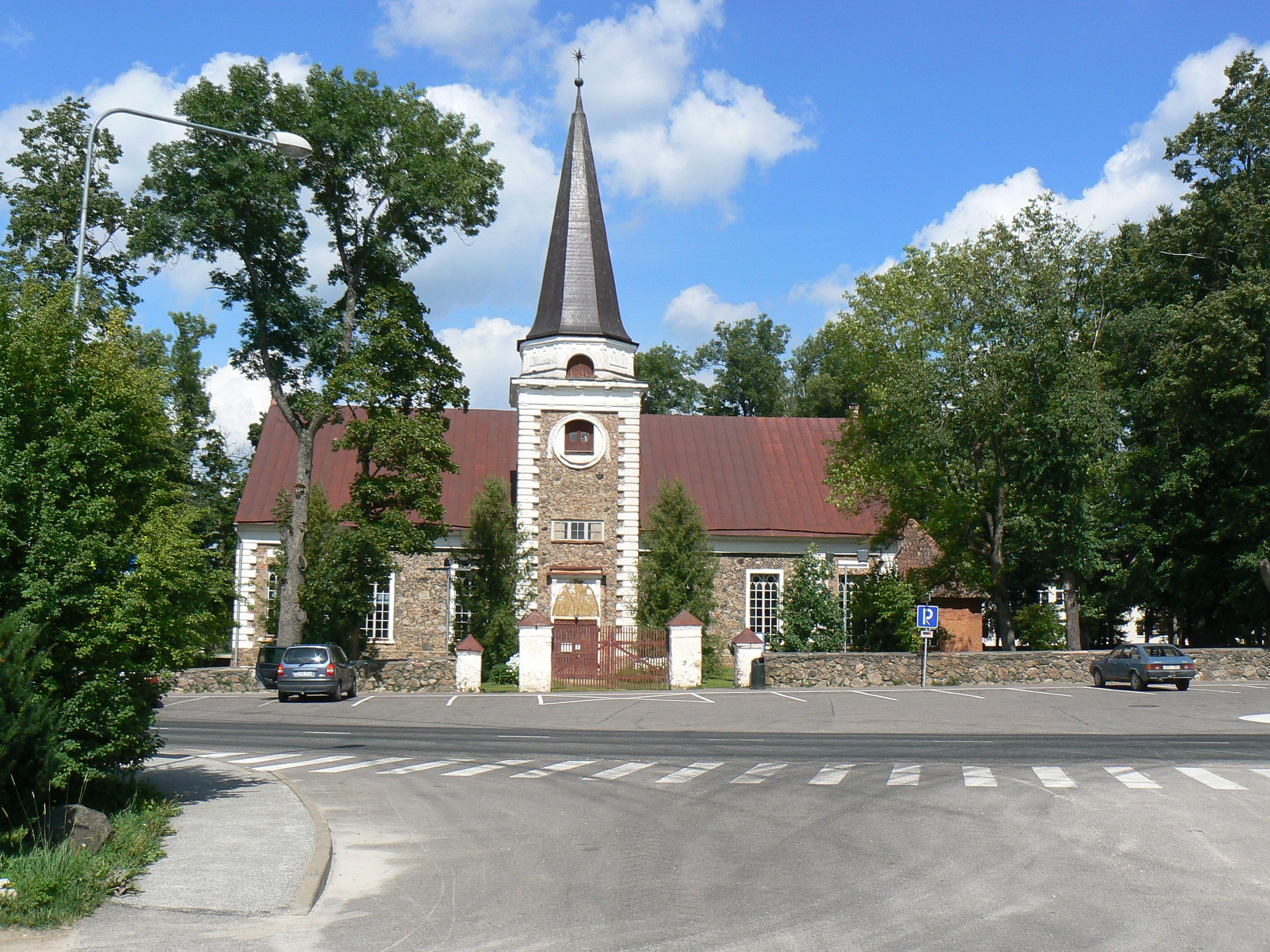
- Kanepi church

- Flag Coat of arms

- Kanepi Parish within Põlva County
- Country: Estonia
- County: Põlva
- Administrative centre: Kanepi

Government
  - Municipality Governor: Helen Rebane (unaffiliated)

Area
  - Total: 524.68 km^{2} (202.58 sq mi)

Population (2026)
  - Total: 4,429
  - Density: 8.441/km^{2} (21.86/sq mi)
- ISO 3166 code: EE-284

Drone video of a hemp themed maze in a hemp (kanep in Estonian) field in Kanepi parish, Estonia (August 2022)

Kanepi Parish (Estonian: Kanepi vald) is a rural municipality in Estonia, located in Põlva County. It has a population of 4,662 (as of 1 January 2020) and covers an area of 524.68 km^{2} (202.58 sq mi). The administrative centre is Kanepi.

It was established in 2017 through the merger of Valgjärve, Kõlleste, and Kanepi Parish.

== History ==
The historical parish of Kanepi was created in 1675, from outer areas of the Põlva, Urvaste and Otepää parishes, and contained most of what now makes up the modern parish. The parish's name most likely derives from the estonian word kanep ("cannabis"), and is connected to the area's history of making clothes from hemp fiber.

The parish in its current form was created on 21 October 2017, as a result of country-wide administrative reform which combined the former parishes of Valgjärve, Kõlleste and Kanepi, which had existed since 1991.

In June 2019, the mayor of the parish, Piret Rammul, visited Romania and signed a contract of collaboration with the romanian parish of Apa, in Satu Mare County.

In July 2022, the parish opened a maze made using hemp plants in Saverna, alonside the Tartu–Võru highway, in a similar fashion to corn mazes which had been created elsewhere in the country. The maze was intended to promote industrial uses of the plant, as well as the parish itself. Kerli Koor, the municipality's cultural advisor, noted that the maze's field was sown with Estonia's first variant of hempseed. She also stated that recent population growth indicated that the parish "stood out" for the quality of its services, not just its coat of arms.

== Demographics ==
=== Population ===
According to Statistics Estonia, on 1 January 2026 the parish had 4,429 residents, of which 2,253 (50.9%) were women and 2,176 (49.1%) were men.

=== Religion ===
In the 2021 census of at least 15-years old residents 11.2 per cent declared themselves Lutheran, 2.6 per cent declared themselves Orthodox, 1.3 per cent as others Christians. 83.2 per cent declared themselves religiously unaffiliated. 1.7 per cent of the population followed other religions or their affiliation remained unknown in the census.

== Geography ==
The lakes Aalupi, Erastvere and Hüüdre are located in Kanepi Parish.

== 2017-2018 insignia selection ==
After the 2017 merger with Valgjärve and Kõlleste parishes, the Kanepi Parish was looking for a new flag and coat of arms. As Kanep is the Estonian word for cannabis, there were several proposed versions of a flag and coat of arms with the cannabis leaf in it.

In an online poll to choose from the seven finalist designs, a cannabis leaf design won with an overwhelming majority of 12,000 votes, far larger than the parish population of 5,000.

In May 2018, the city council held a vote on officially adopting the proposed flag, which passed with a 9-8 majority. On 15 May 2018, the municipality's mayor Andrus Seeme announced that the cannabis leaf flag would become official, and on 13 July 2018 the flag was raised outside the Kanepi municipal building.

== Gallery ==
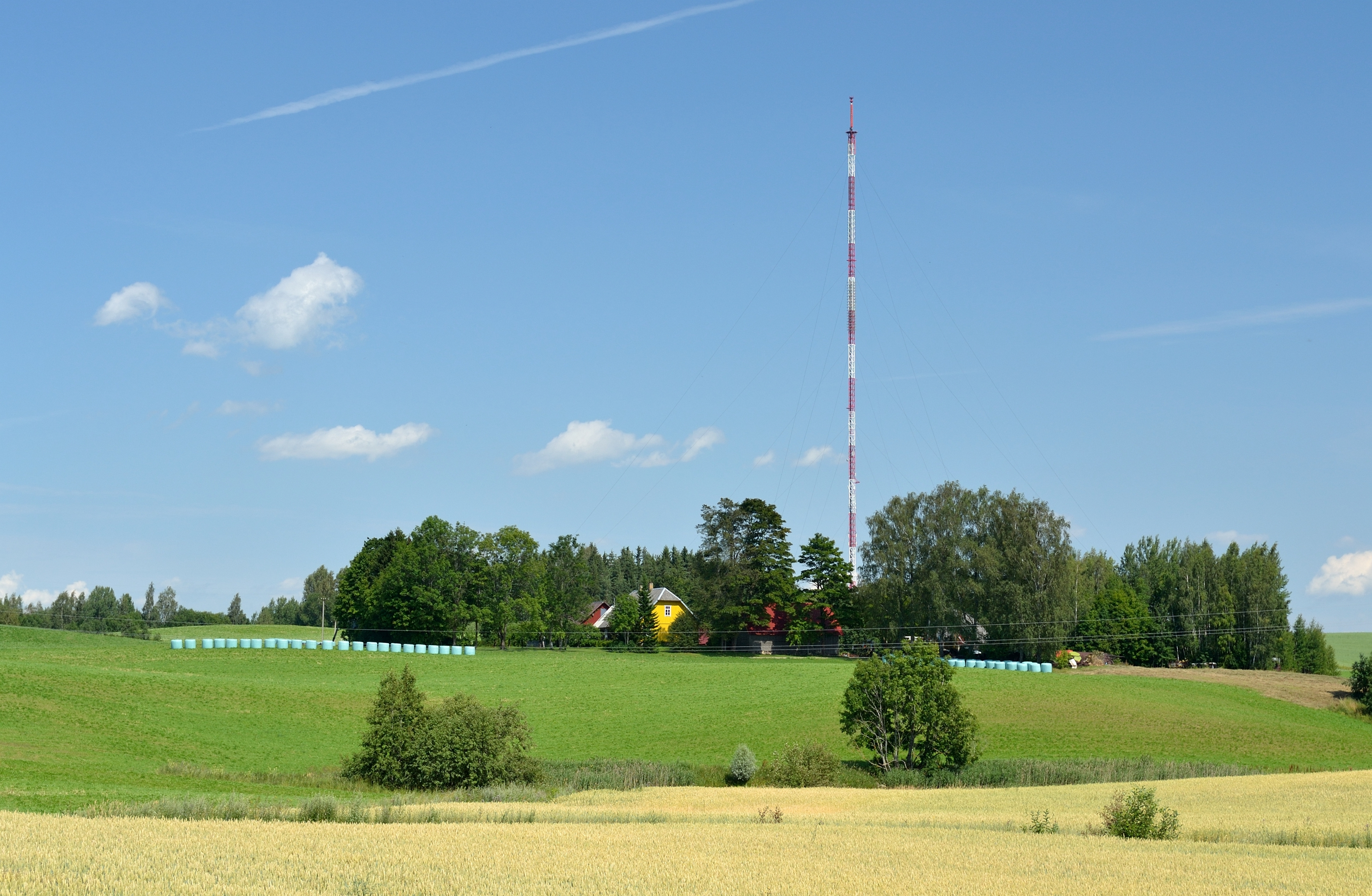
TV mast in Pikareinu village

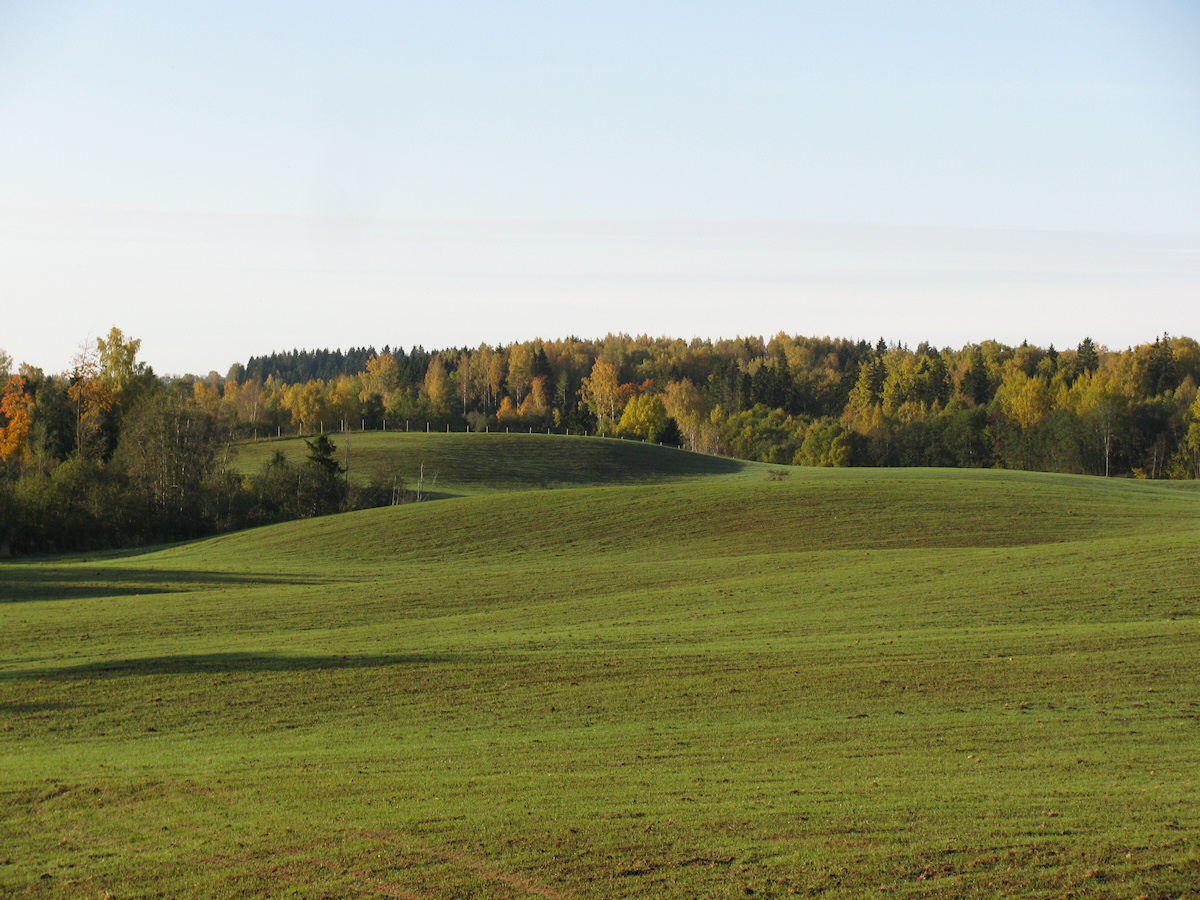
On the road between Saverna and Valgjärve

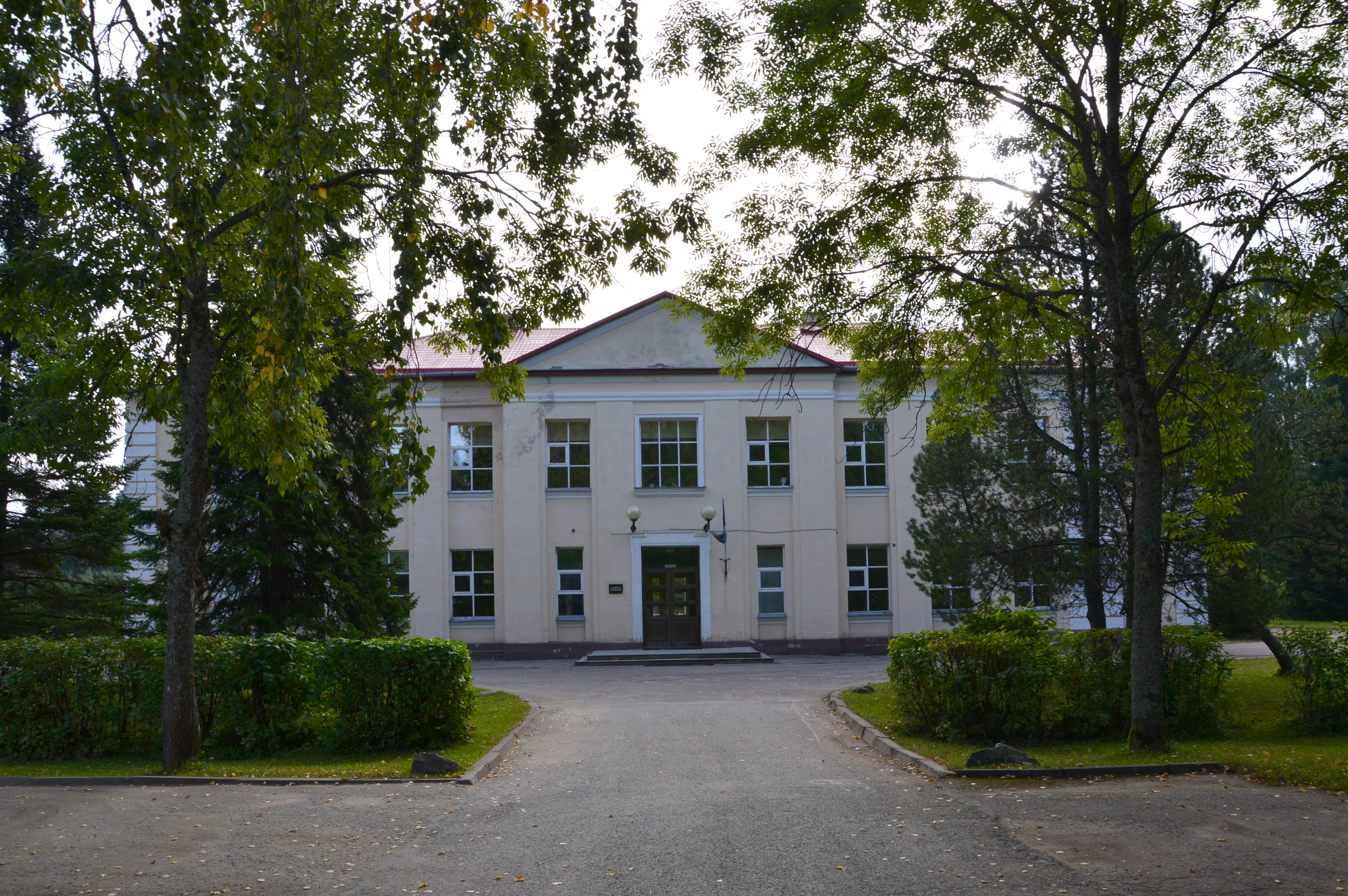
Schoolhouse in Saverna

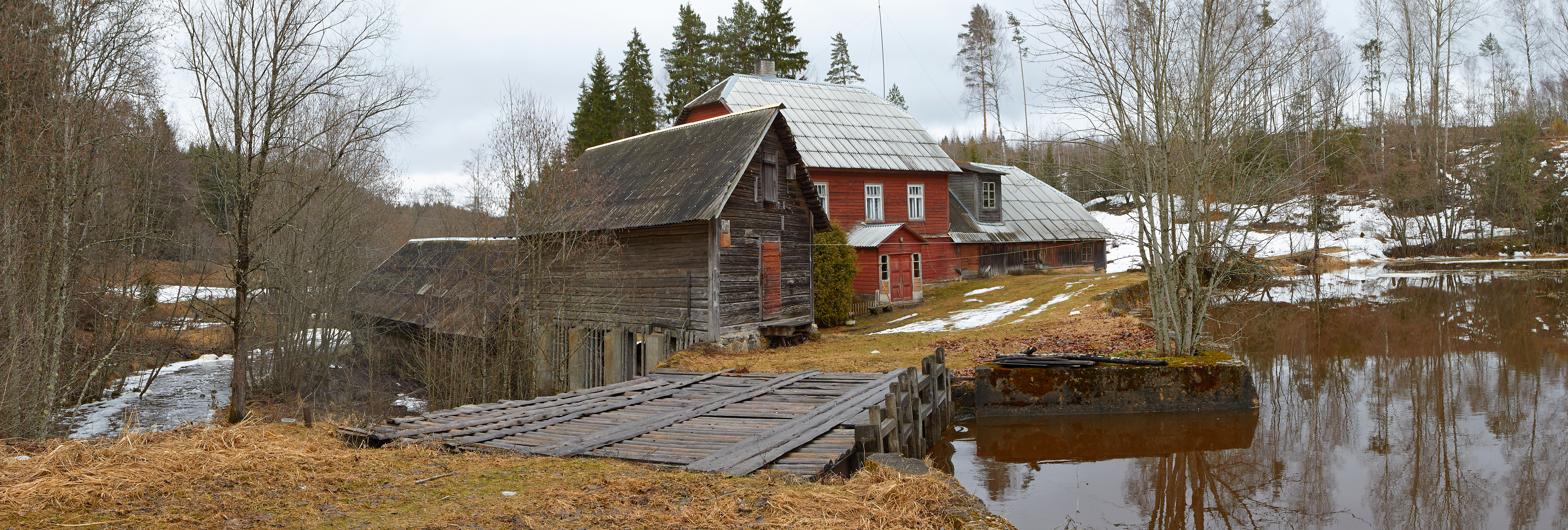
Watermill in Roti, the village of Hurmi

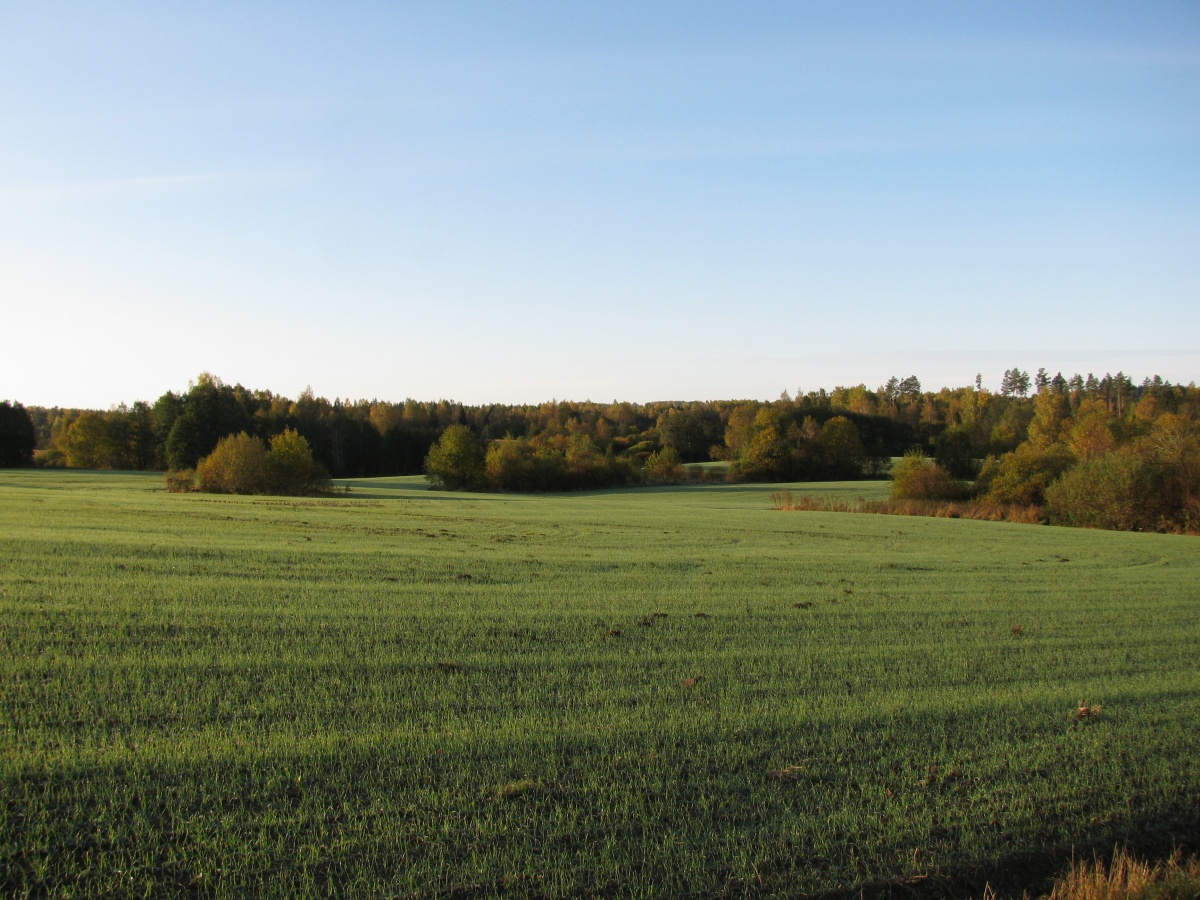
Between Saverna and Valgjärve

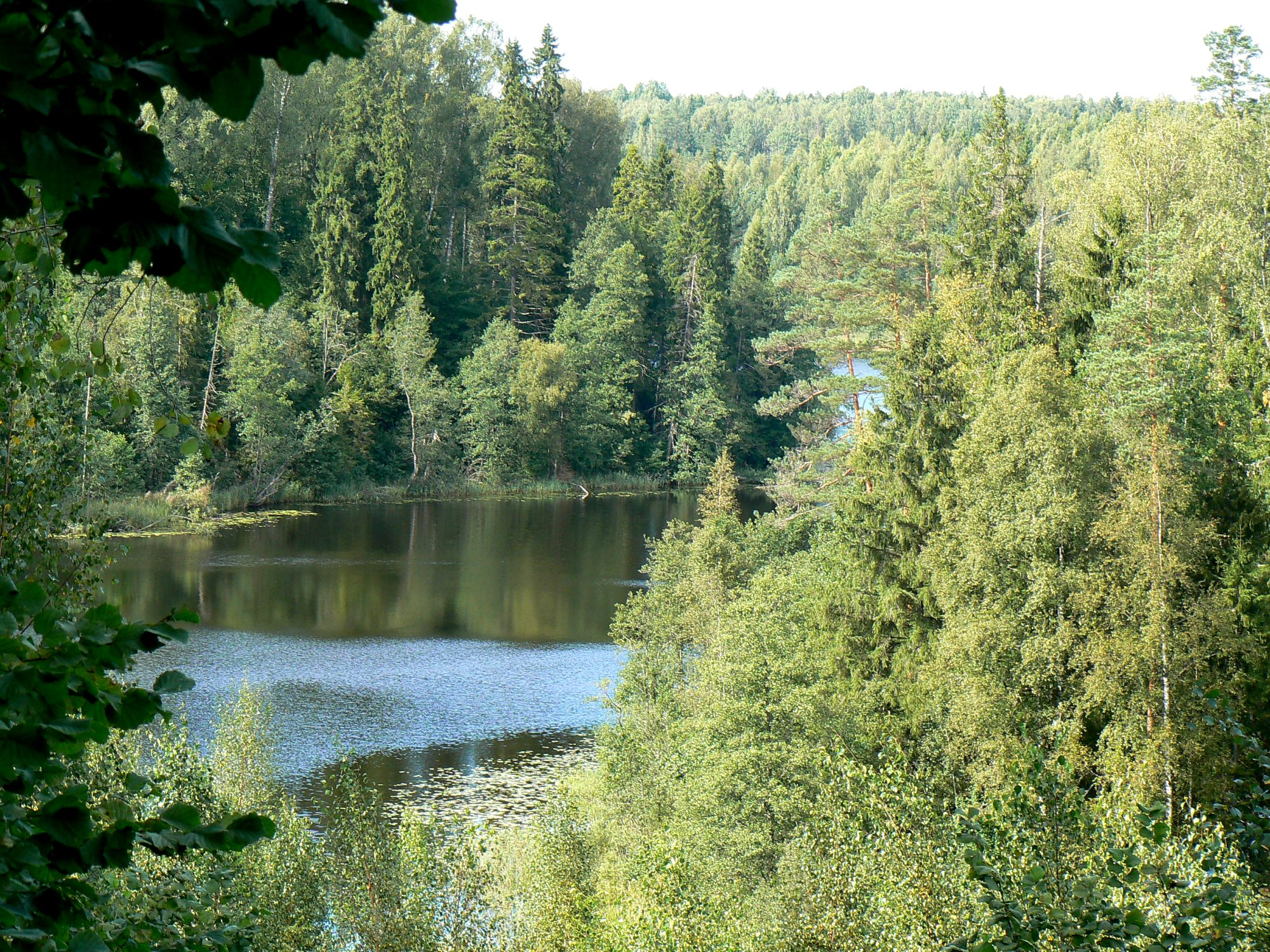
A lake in Kooraste area

== Notable people ==
- Hermann Guido von Samson-Himmelstjerna (1809 in Kooraste – 1868), a Baltic German medical doctor and professor of state pharmacopoeia
- Hugo Treffner (1845 in Ritsike – 1912), founded the Hugo Treffner Gymnasium and was a figure in the Estonian national awakening.
- Elise Aun (1863 in Pikareinu – 1932), a poet and writer; a notable woman writer in 19 C. Estonia
- Saul Hallap (1897 in Hino – 1941), a middleweight weightlifter who competed at the 1924 Summer Olympics
- Kalev Arro (1915 in Valgjärve Parish – 1974), partisan and part of the Forest Brothers
- Heino Sisask (1928 in Sirvaste – 2023), politician, racewalker and sports personality
- Sirje Kapper (born 1992 in Maaritsa), football manager and former player who played 216 games and 15 for Estonia women

== See also ==
- Battle of Erastfer
