= University of Tartu Folk Art Ensemble =

Estonian folk dance group

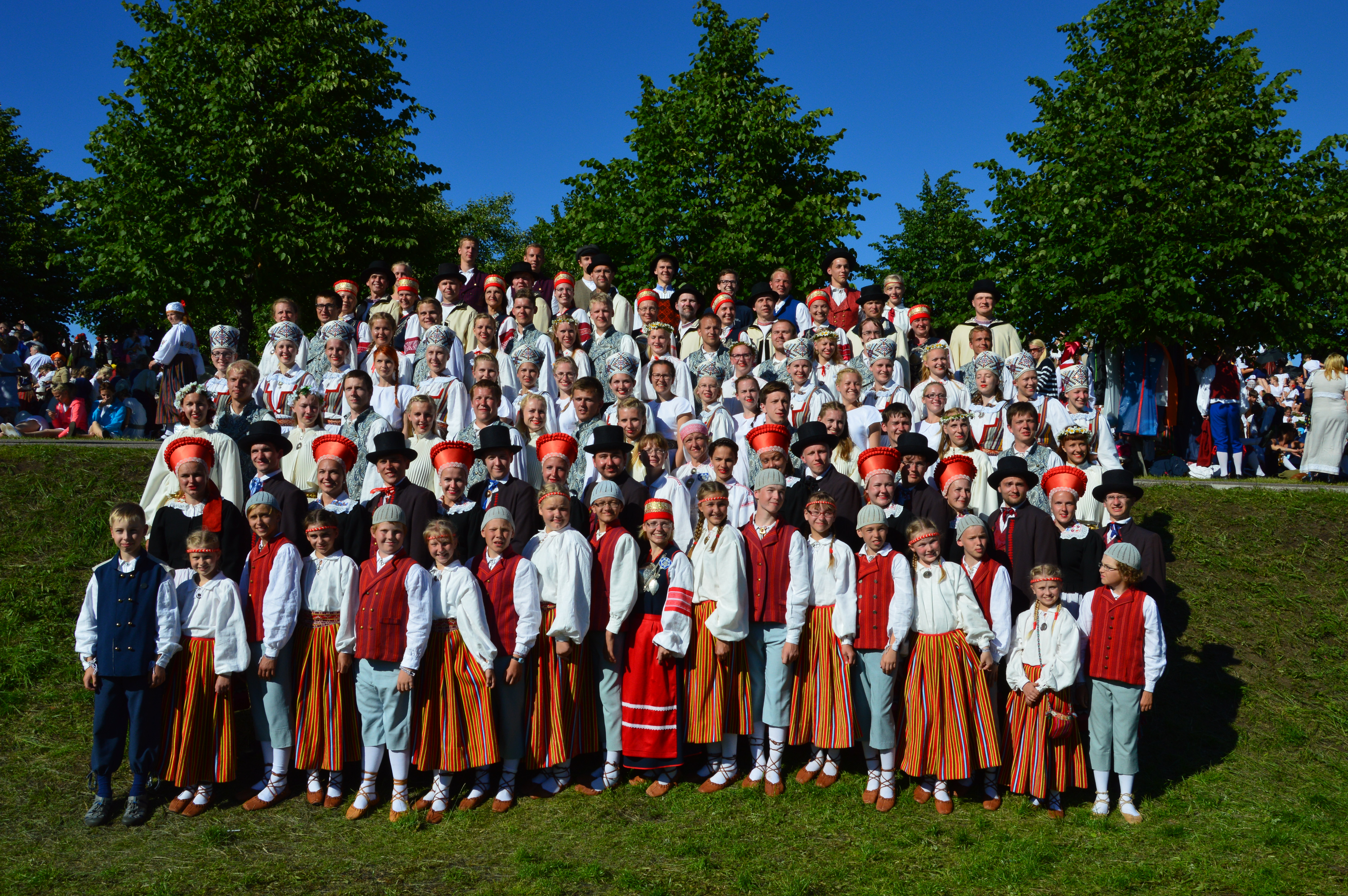
University of Tartu Folk Art Ensemble in XIX Estonian Dance Celebration in 2014

University of Tartu Folk Art Ensemble (Estonian: Tartu Ülikooli Rahvakunstiansambel or TÜ RKA) is a University of Tartu folk dance group. It was founded in 1945 and as of 2015 there were around 150 dancers, that makes it one of the oldest and biggest folk dance groups in Estonia.

== History ==
Ilmar Reidla brought together different faculty groups in Tartu State University (TRÜ; name of Tartu University during occupation times) and folk dance group with 10–12 pairs was formed in 1945. Reidla acted as supervisor until 1948 when Ester Prinits took over.

In 1951 Estonian Agricultural Academy was formed from three Tartu State University faculties (Veterinary Science, Forestry, Agriculture). Students formed their own group under guidance of forestry student Ilmar Reidla.

As of spring 1953 only four pairs had remained and they merged with Tartu Teachers Institute group whose leader was Helju Mikkel. Soon new students started to join and in autumn 1954 it was already possible to form three different training groups. Folk orchestra and some singers also merged with the group. Newly formed ensemble was composed of over 40 students and it gave its first concert in 1955.

Second half of 1950s turned out to be greatly successful. Number of students in ensemble grew and Helju Mikkel created several new dances. In 1956 TRÜ RKA performed as the representative of Estonian dance in Moscow.

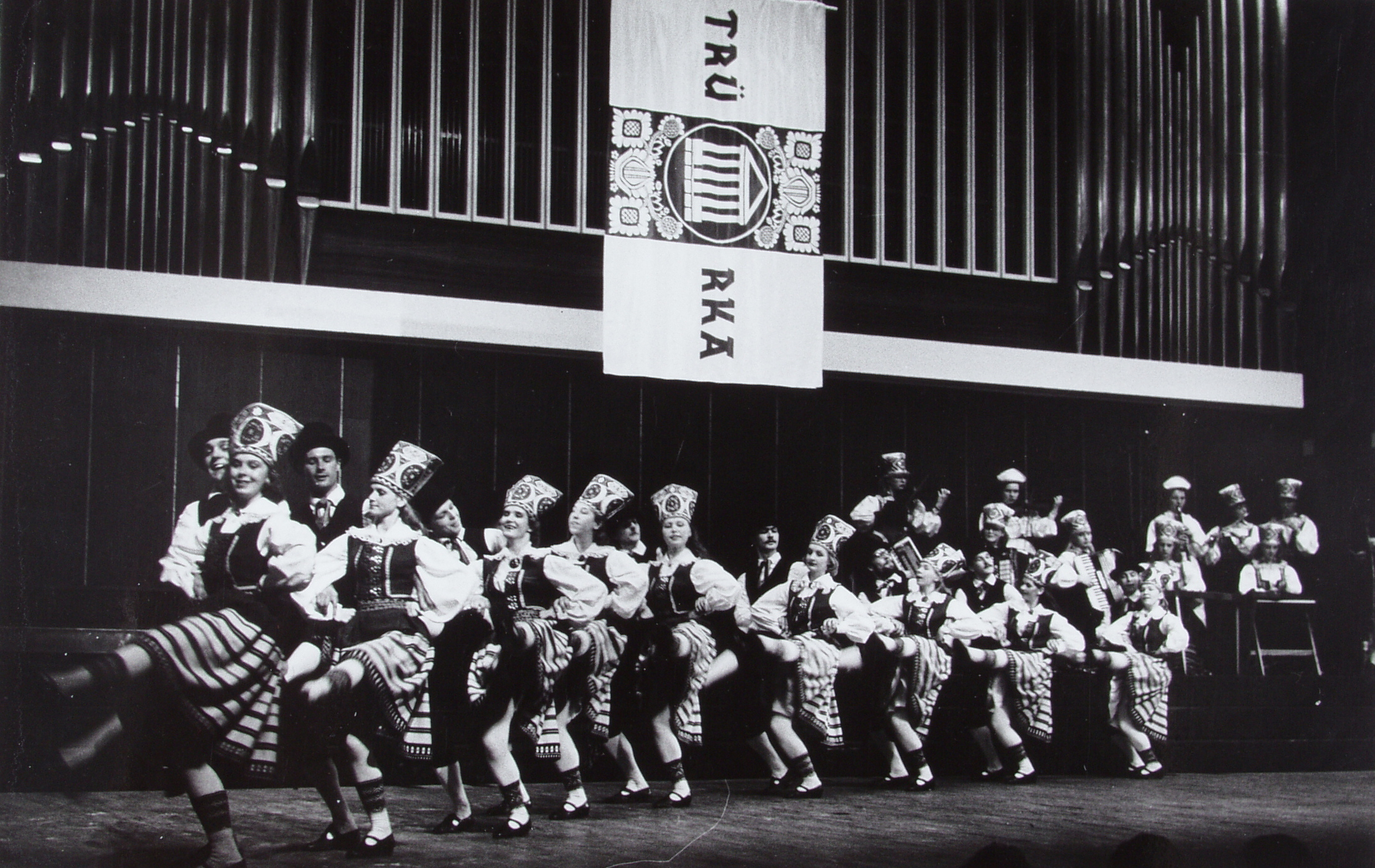
Anniversary concert in 1985.

1956 was also the year when the first Gaudeamus festival was held, that brought together university students from all three Baltic countries. It was organised by Richard Ritsing and Helju Mikkel.

Ensemble celebrated its 20th jubilee in 1965. Ants Siimer and Kaljo Soonets set together a comprehensive overview of the ensembles activities over the years and based on this TRÜ RKA was given an honorable title of meritorious ensemble of Estonian SSR.

Mikkel retired in 1978 and Henn Tiivel, who had started dancing in ensemble already in 1966, took the role as the art director. Ensemble kept on giving a lot of performances in Estonia and in abroad.

Restoration of the Estonian independence after Soviet occupation meant hard times for the ensemble as it lost its place for training. Opening up of new possibilities reduced the interest for folk dance and the number of students in ensemble started to shrink rapidly. Singers and musicians left as well.

For 50th anniversary in 1995 many older dancers returned and an alumni group of folk ensemble formed.

Aveli Asber (:et) became the new art director in 2005.

In 2000s folk dance has regained its popularity in Estonia. It has specially gained momentum among the younger generation and this has also expanded the ranks of ensemble. When TÜ RKA celebrated its 70th anniversary in 2015 in Vanemuise concert hall it had around 150 dancers. Next to the groups of university students there are also an alumni group and children group that compromises of the children of the alumni group.

== Gallery ==
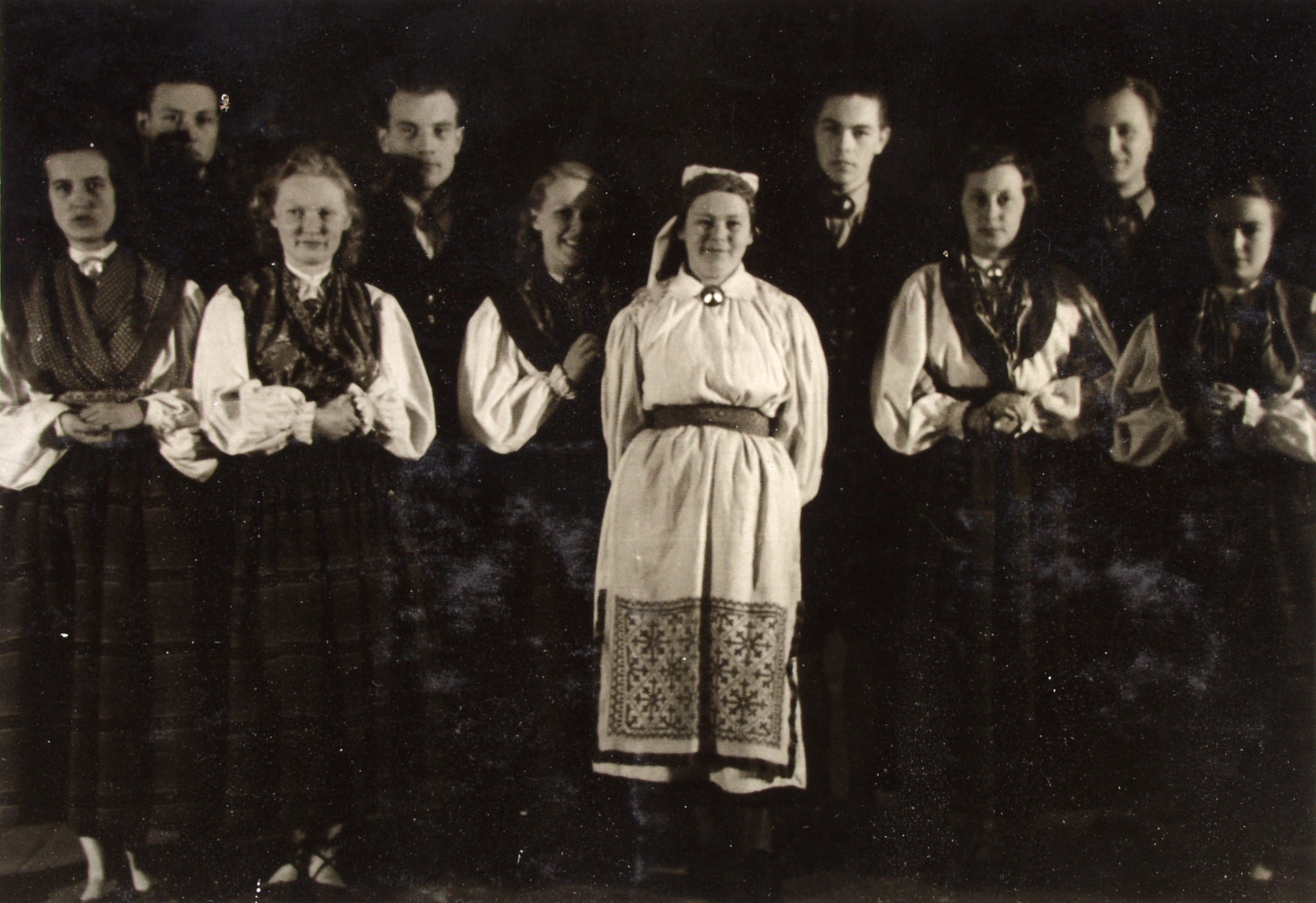
1950s, Helju Mikkel in center

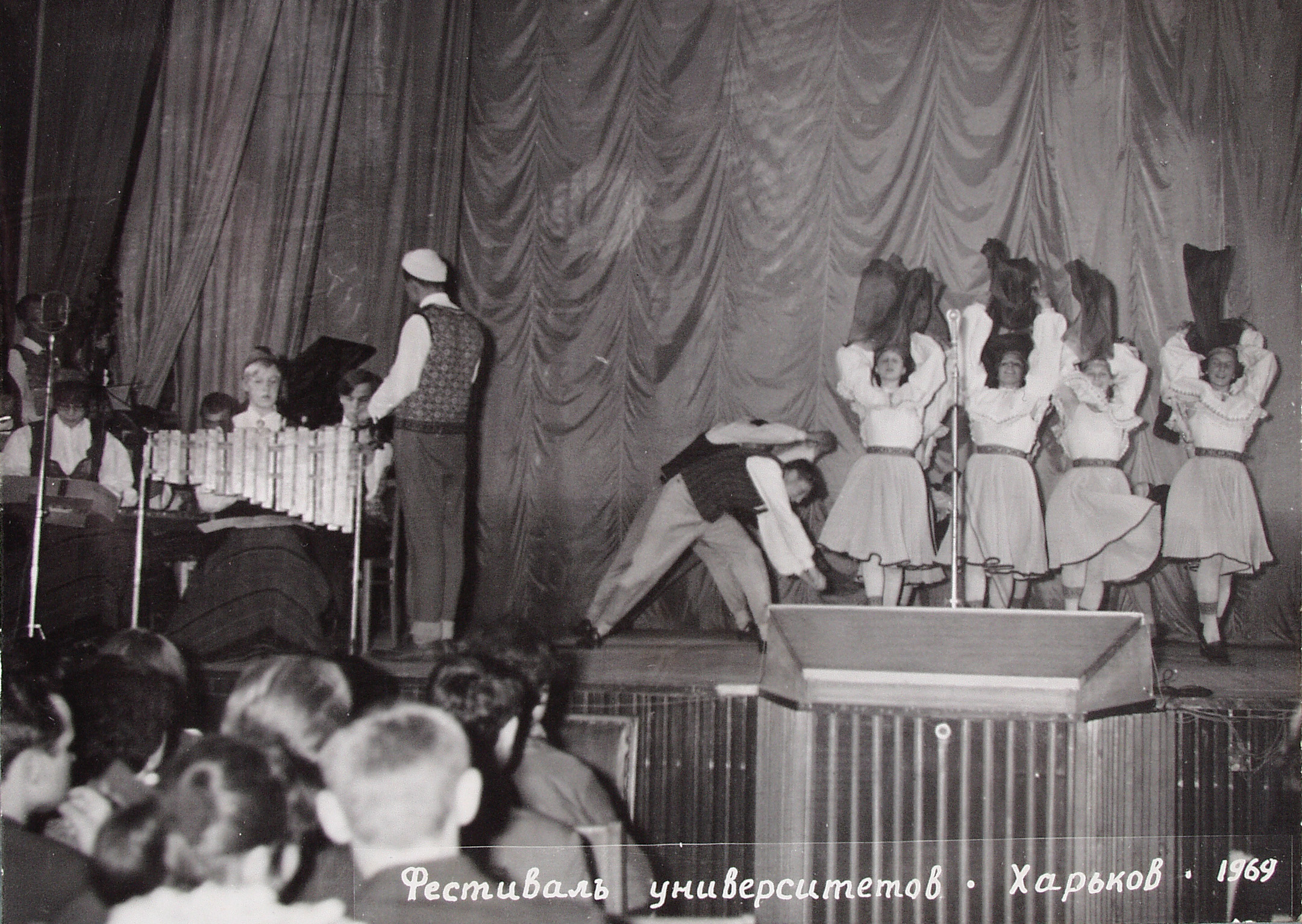
Performing in Kharkiv in 1969

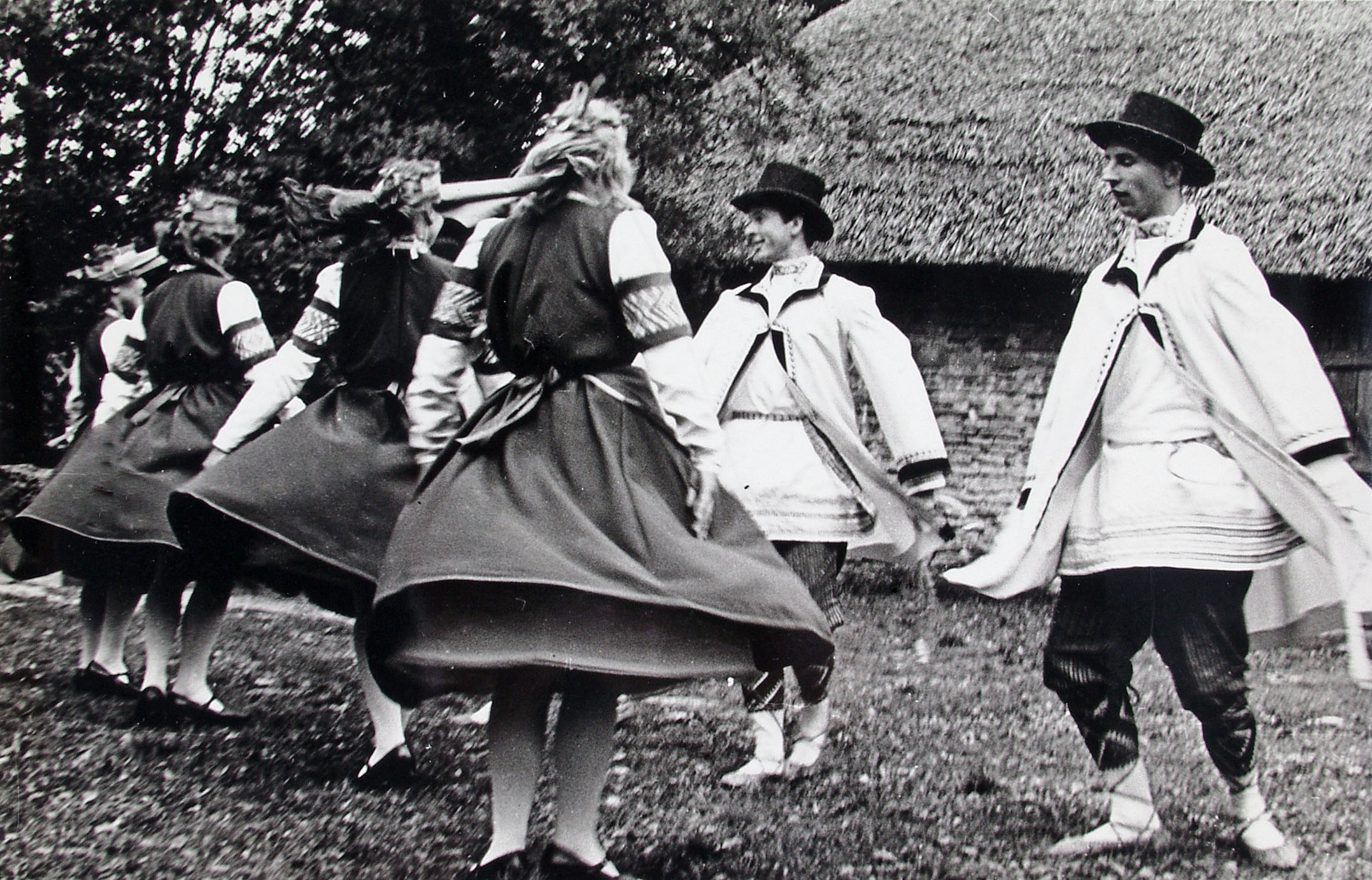
Filming Elavad mustrid in 1970

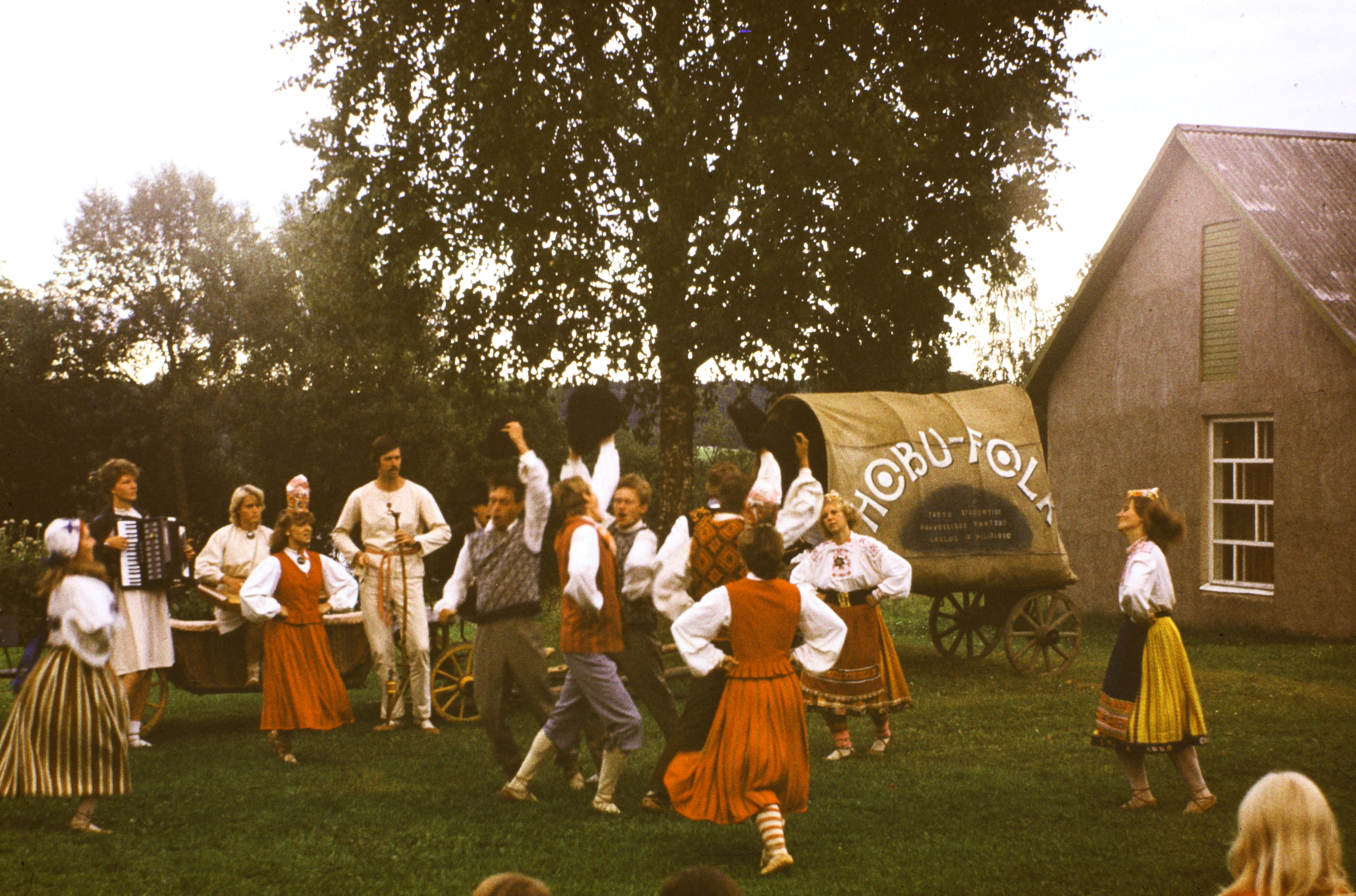
Hobu folk in 1984

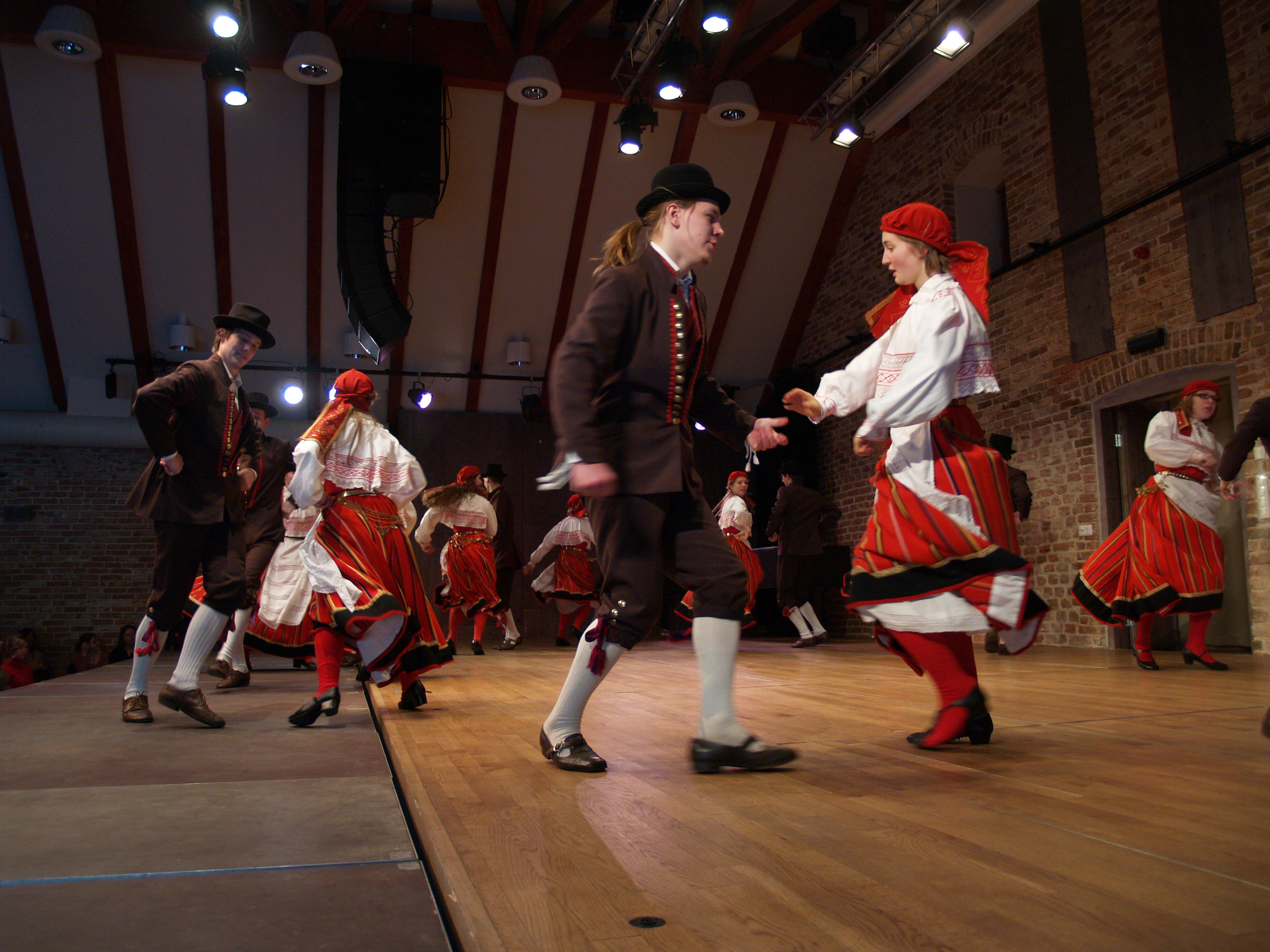
Viljandi Winter Dance Festival in 2010

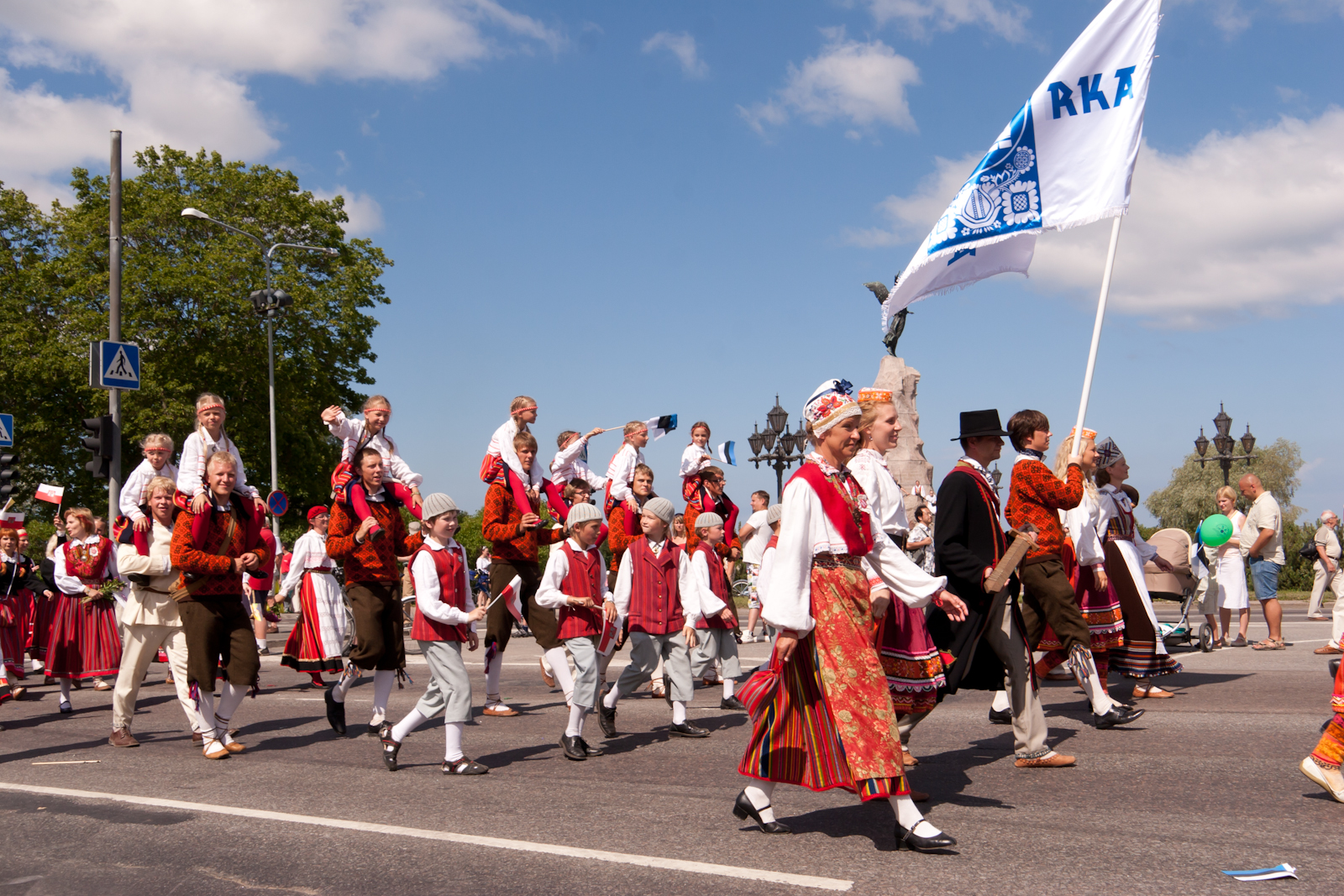
11th Youth Song and Dance Celebration in 2011

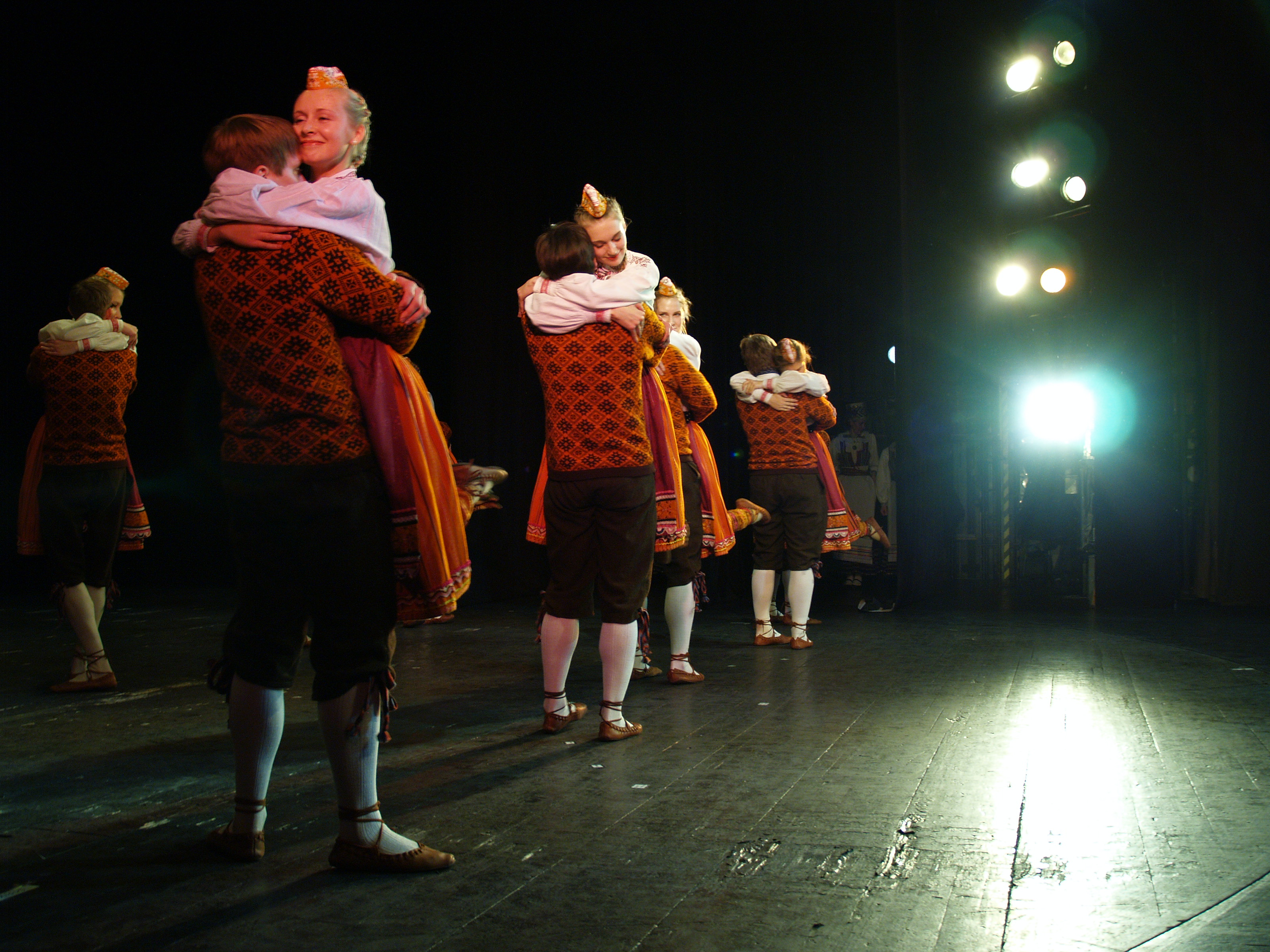
Concert on the stage of Vanemuine (2011)

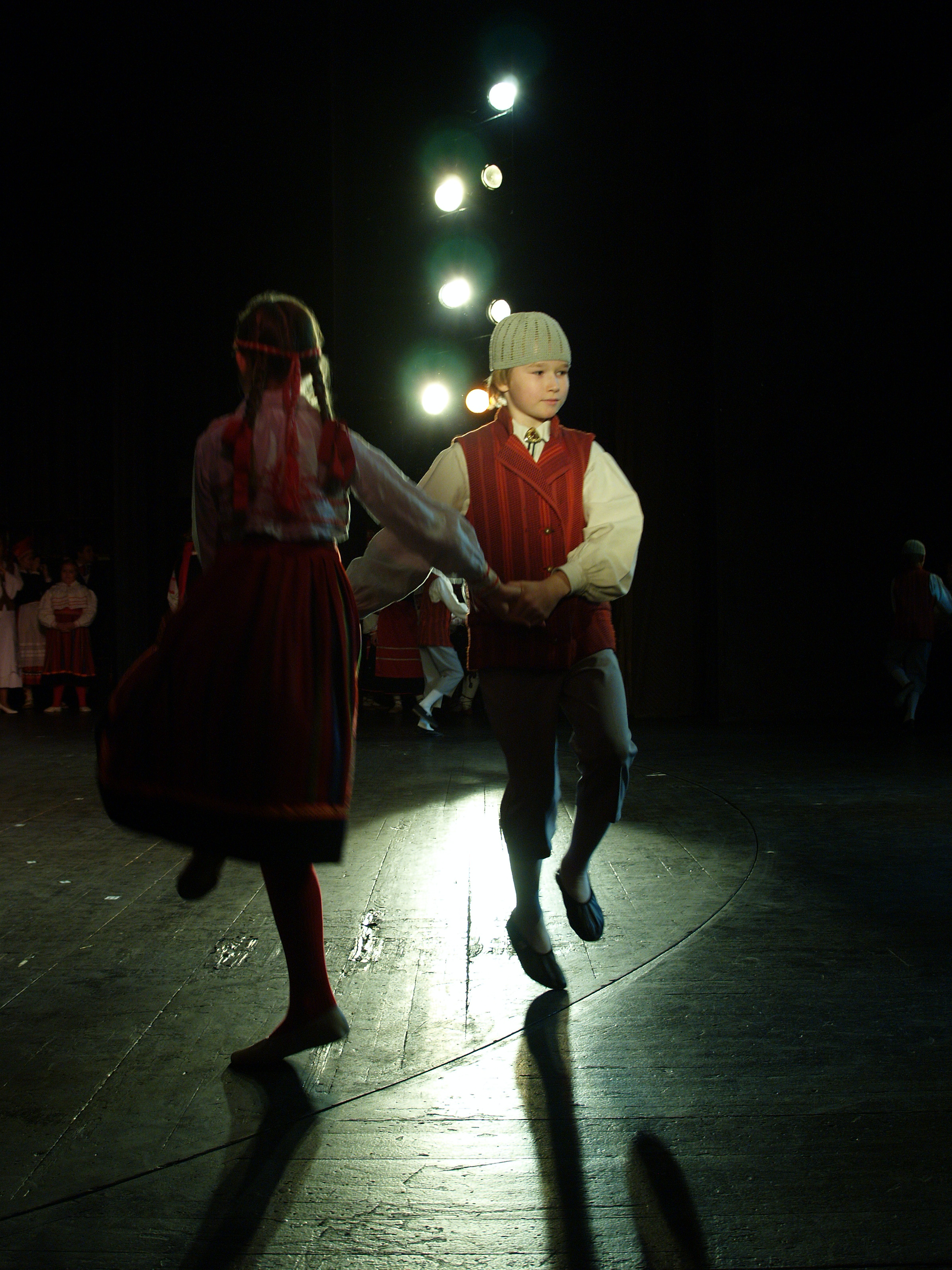
Children group (2011)

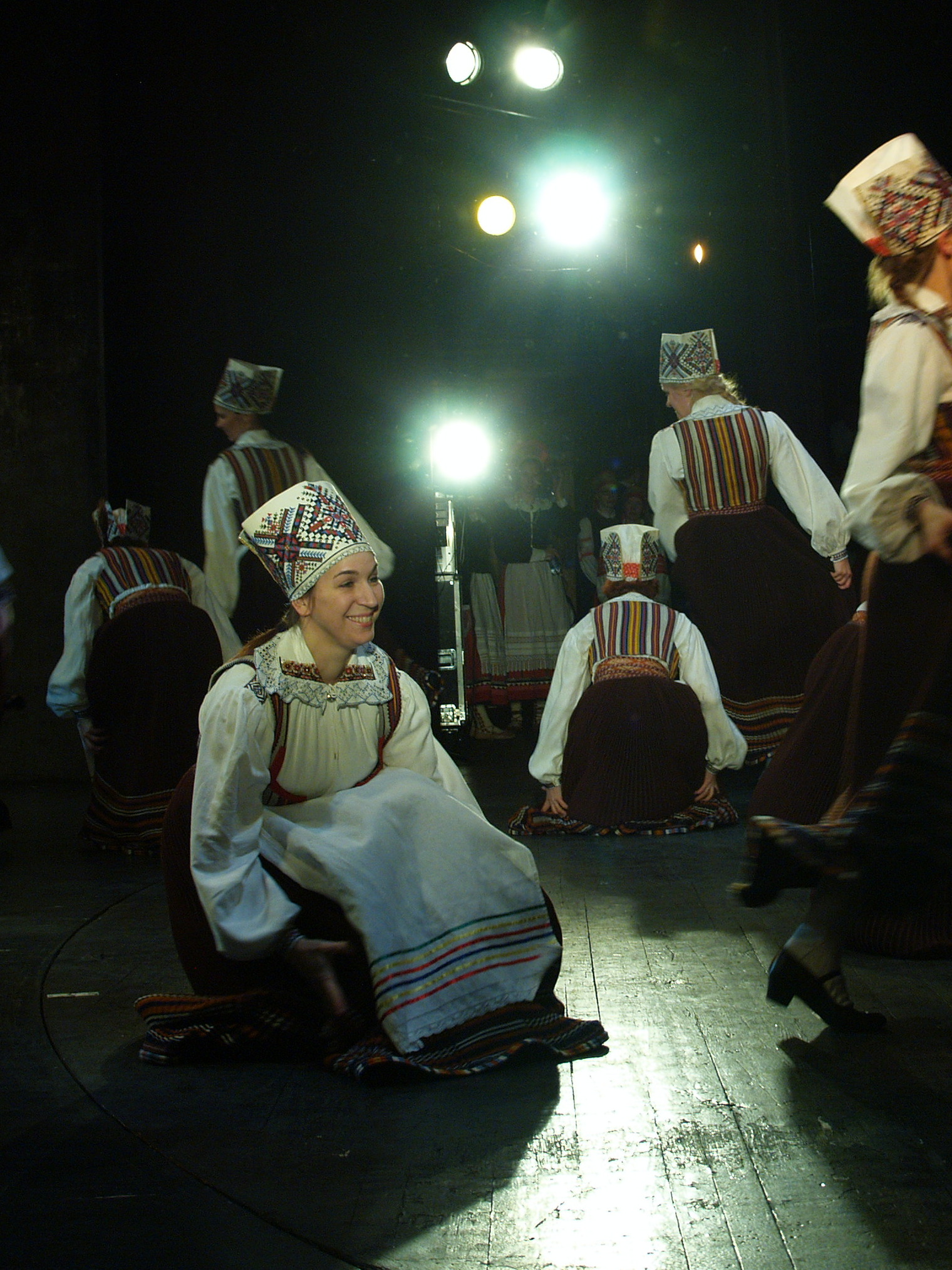
Women's group (2011)

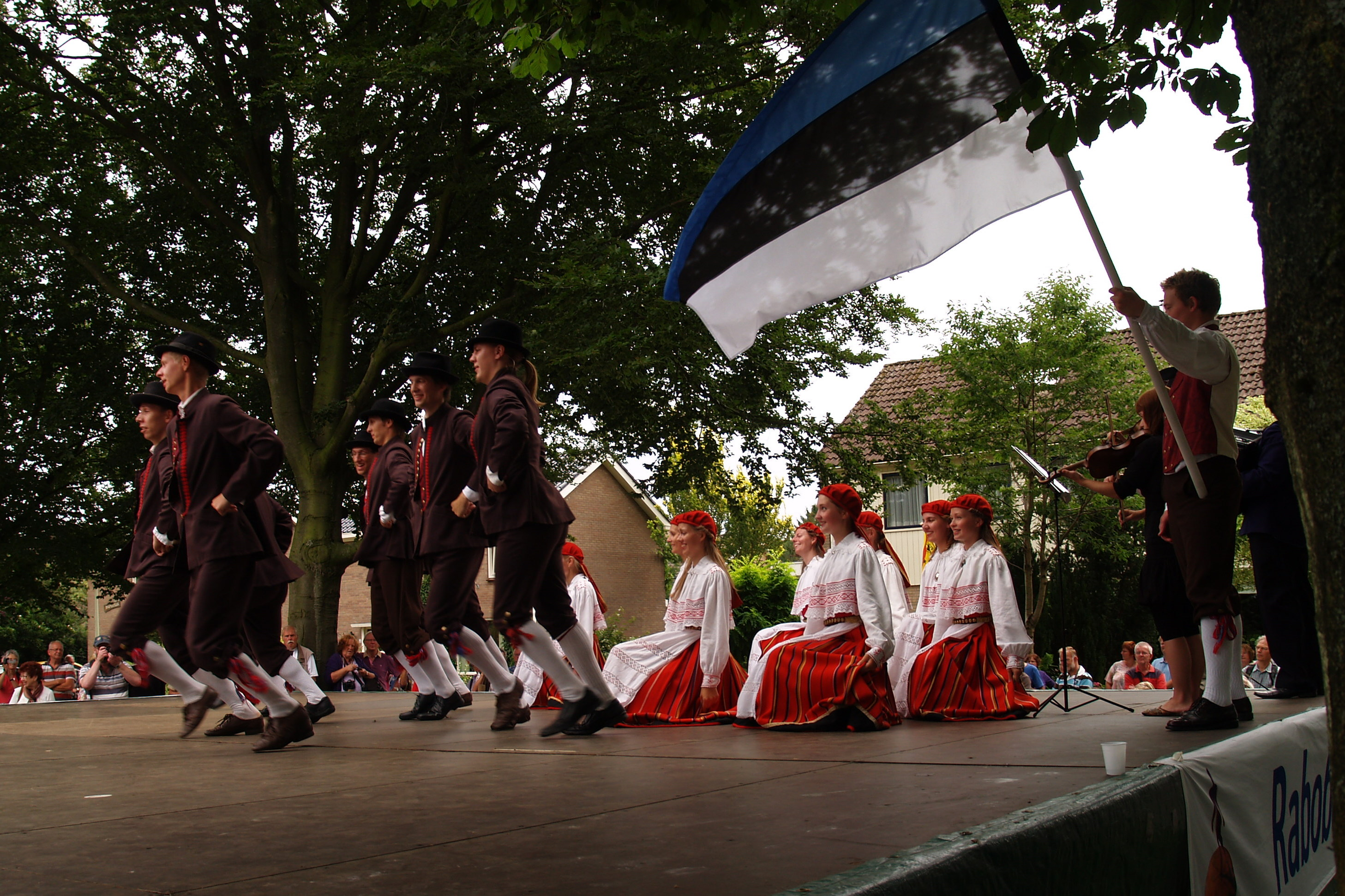
Performing in Netherlands (2010)

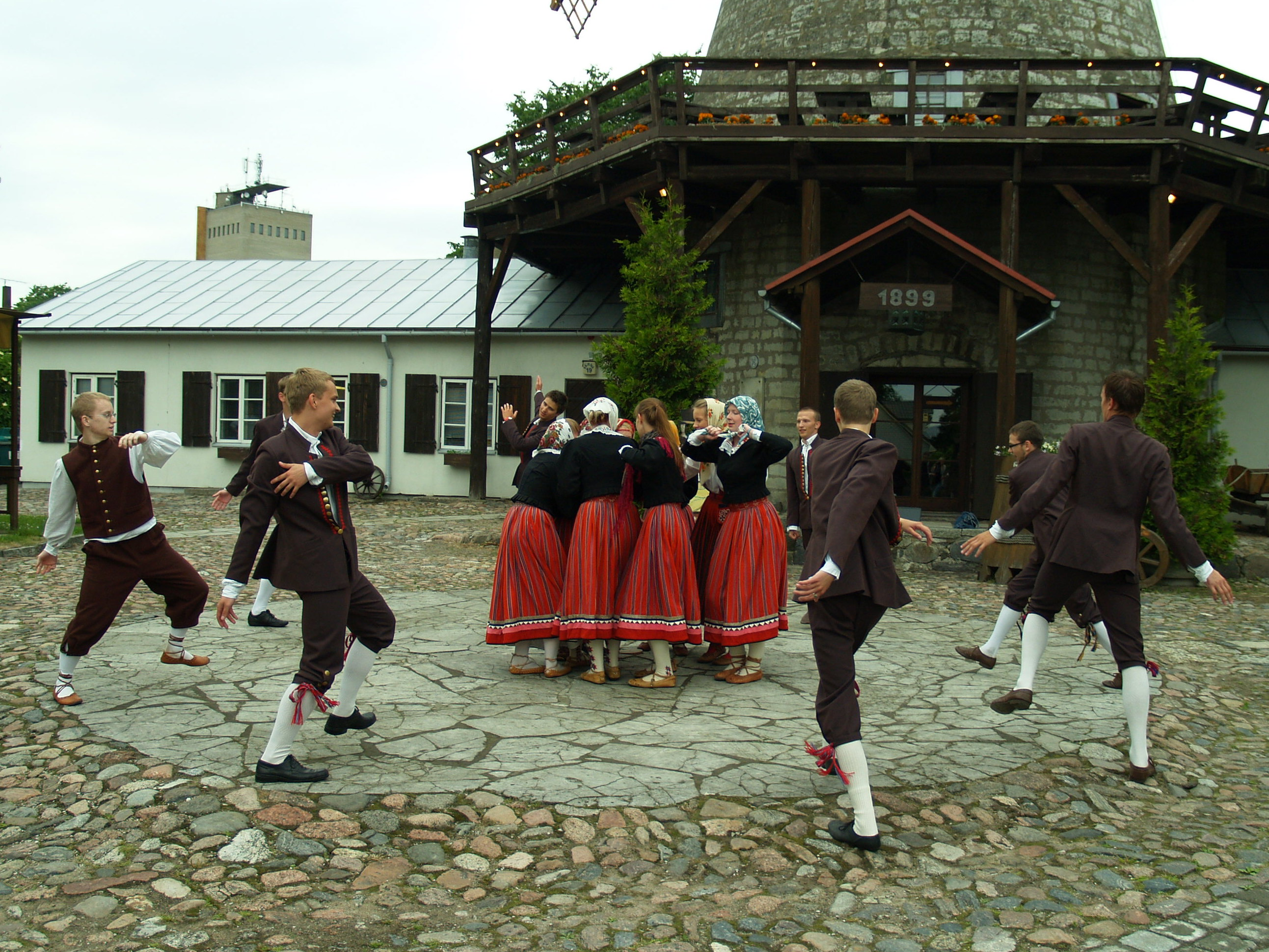
Concert in Kuressaare in 2012

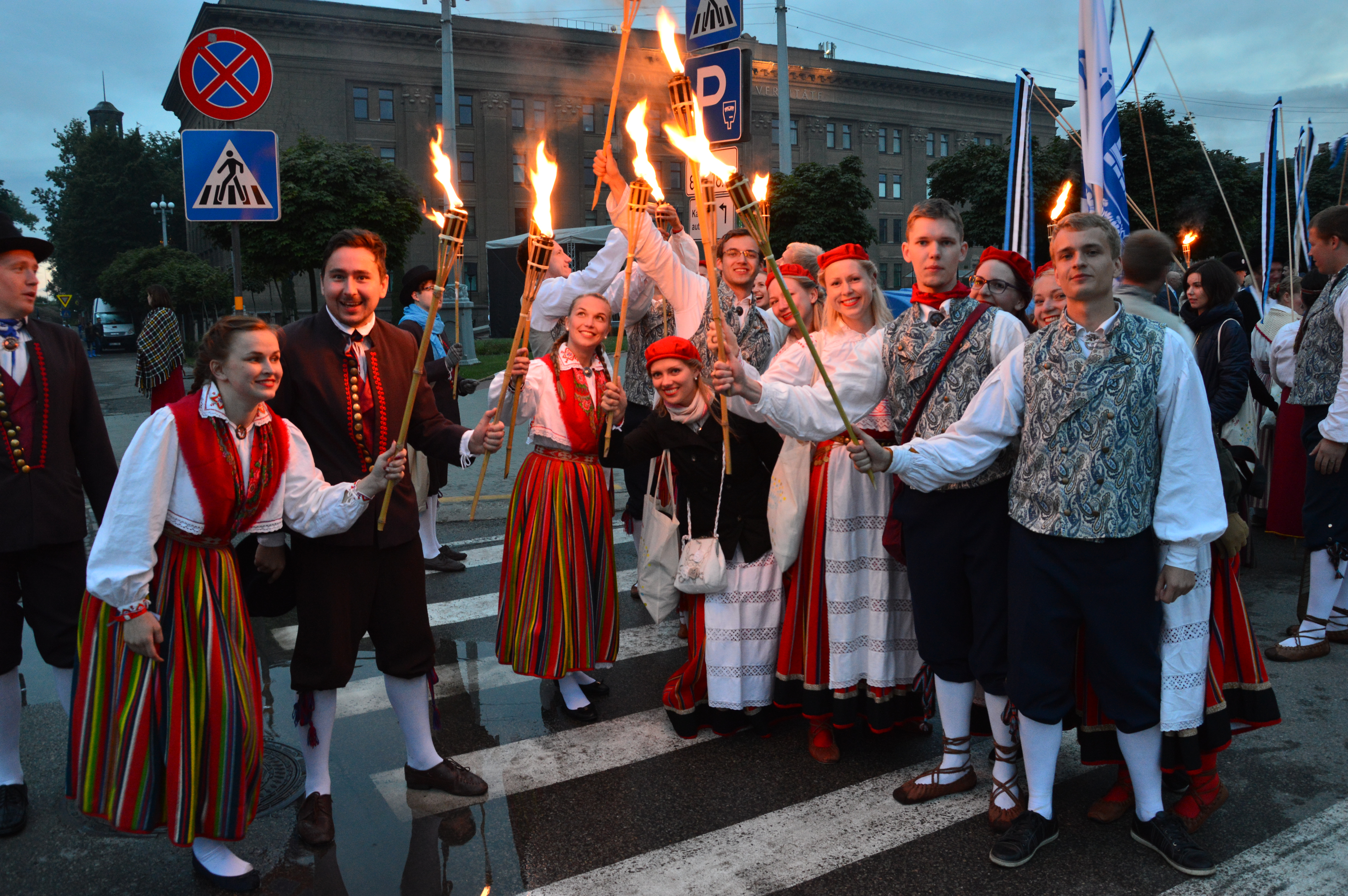
Gaudeamus festival in 2014
