= Lake Räpina =

Lake in Estonia

- Räpina järv (Estonian)
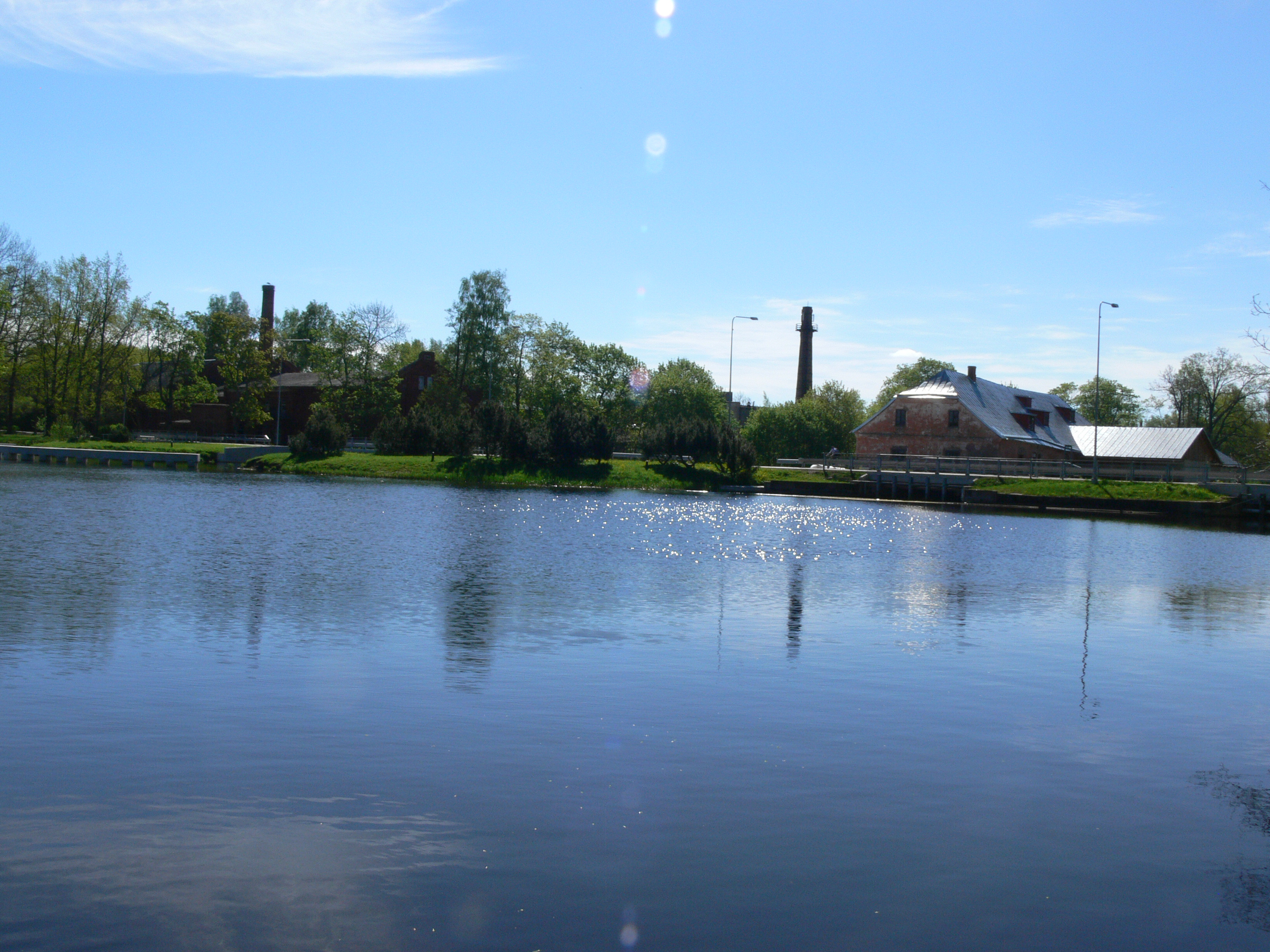

- Location within Estonia
- Location: Põlva County
- Coordinates: 58.100°N 27.453°E
- Primary inflows: Võhandu
- Catchment area: 1,131 square kilometers (437 sq mi)
- Basin countries: Estonia
- Max. length: 1,120 meters (3,670 ft)
- Surface area: 19.3 hectares (48 acres)
- Max. depth: 2.8 meters (9 ft 2 in)
- Shore length^{1}: 3,350 meters (10,990 ft)
- Surface elevation: 35.5 meters (116 ft)
- ^{1} Shore length is not a well-defined measure.

Lake Räpina (Estonian: Räpina järv, also known as Räpina paisjärv) is a lake in Estonia. It is located in the town of Räpina in Räpina Parish, Põlva County. It is in the southeast of the country close to the border with Russia. The entire lake has been added to the environmental register as an important habitat for bats. At the southern end of the lake is Estonia's oldest and still operating paper factory.

== Physical description ==
The lake has an area of 19.3 hectares (48 acres). The lake has a maximum depth of 2.8 meters (9 ft 2 in). It is 1,120 meters (3,670 ft) long, and its shoreline measures 3,350 meters (10,990 ft).

== Gallery ==
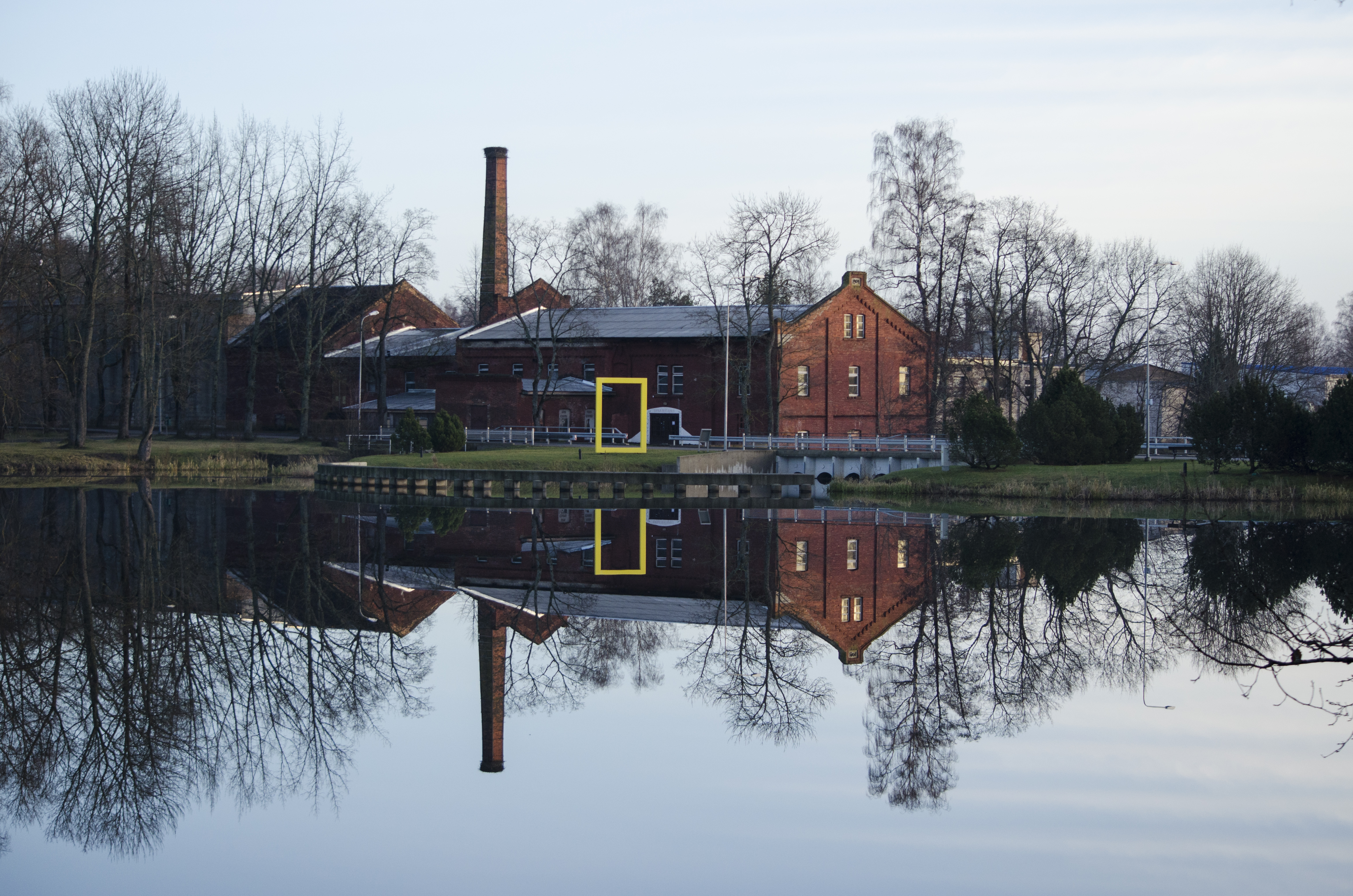

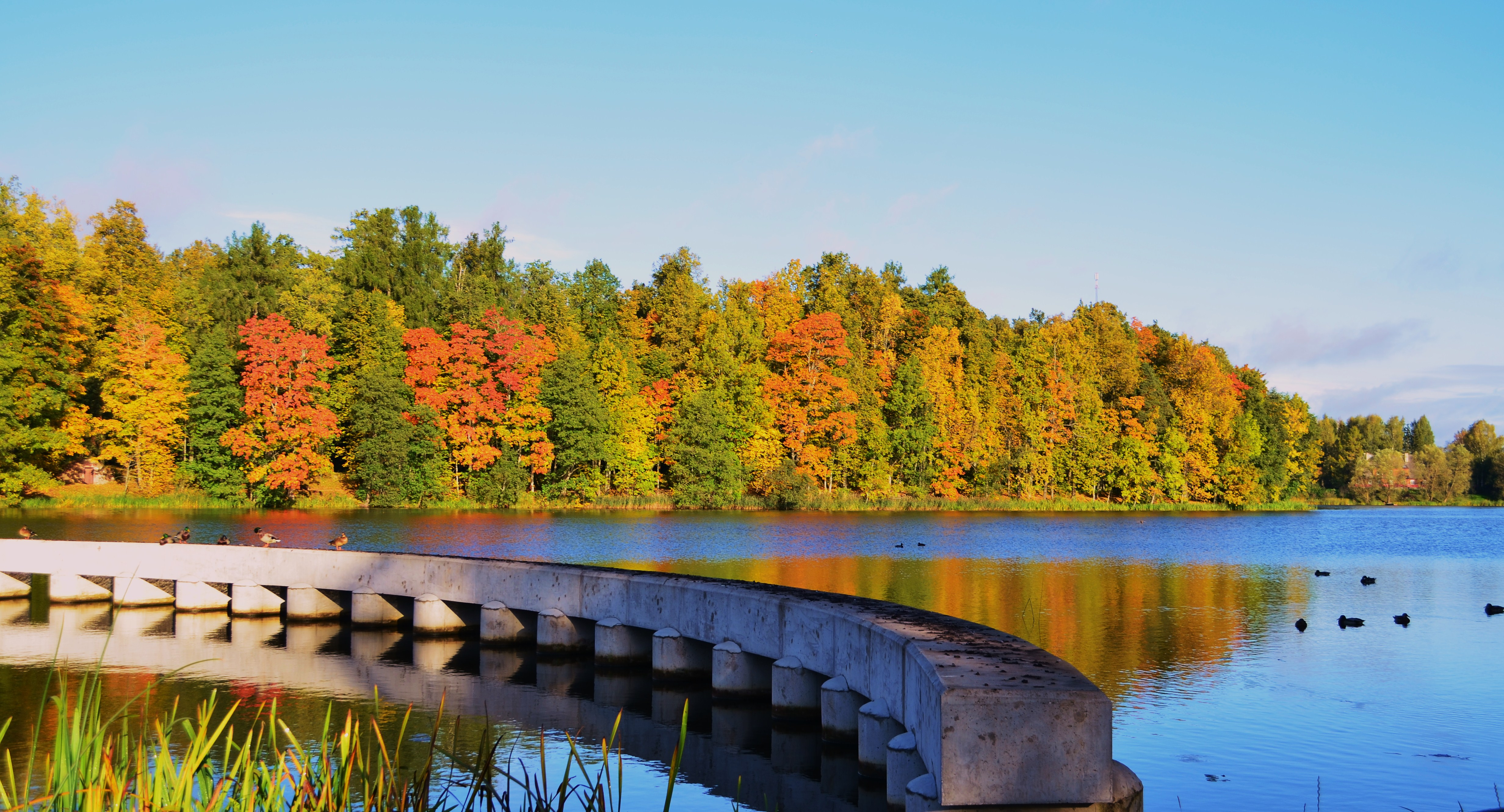

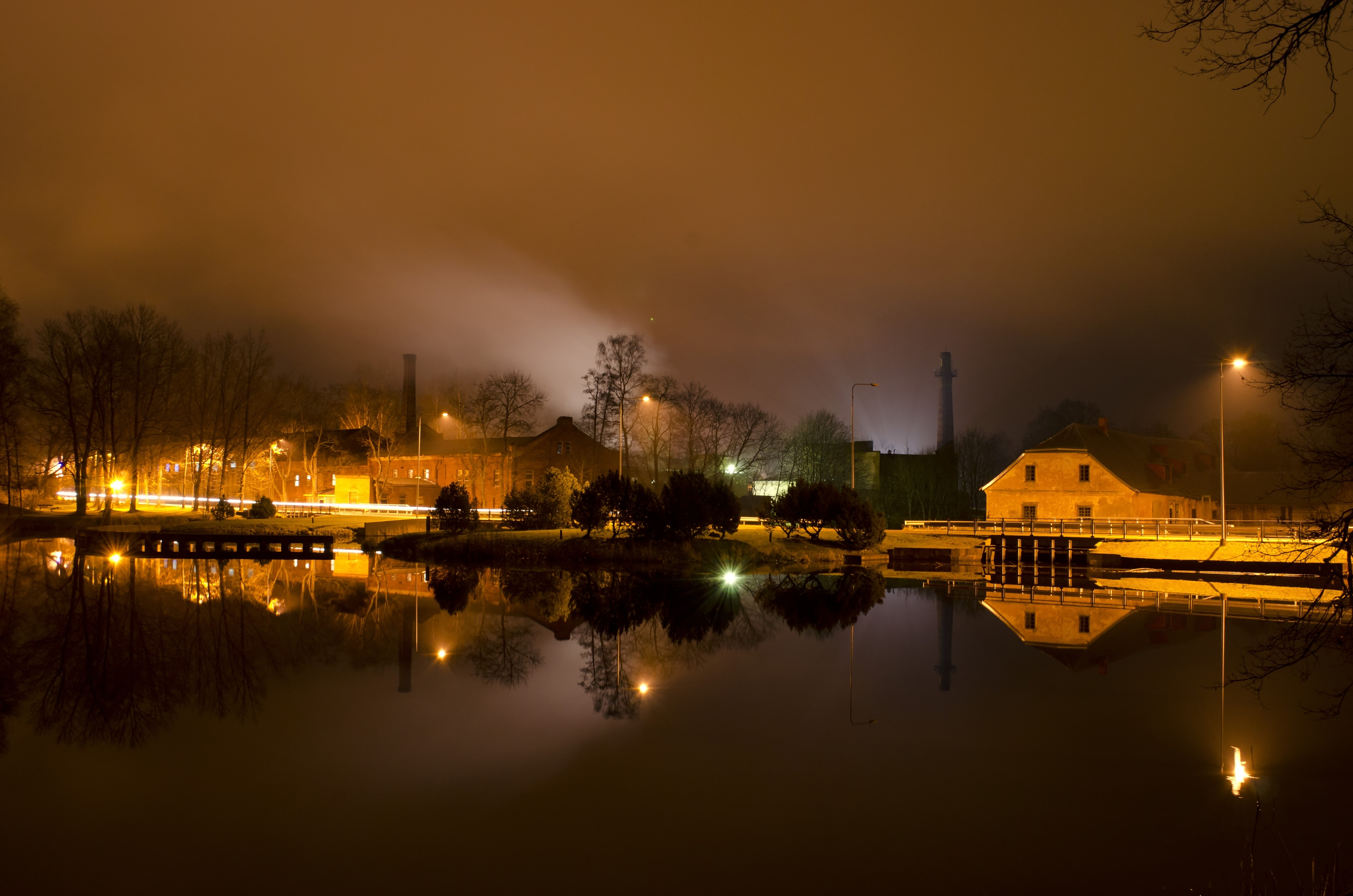

== See also ==
- List of lakes of Estonia
