= Helju Mikkel =

Estonian folk dancer and choreographer

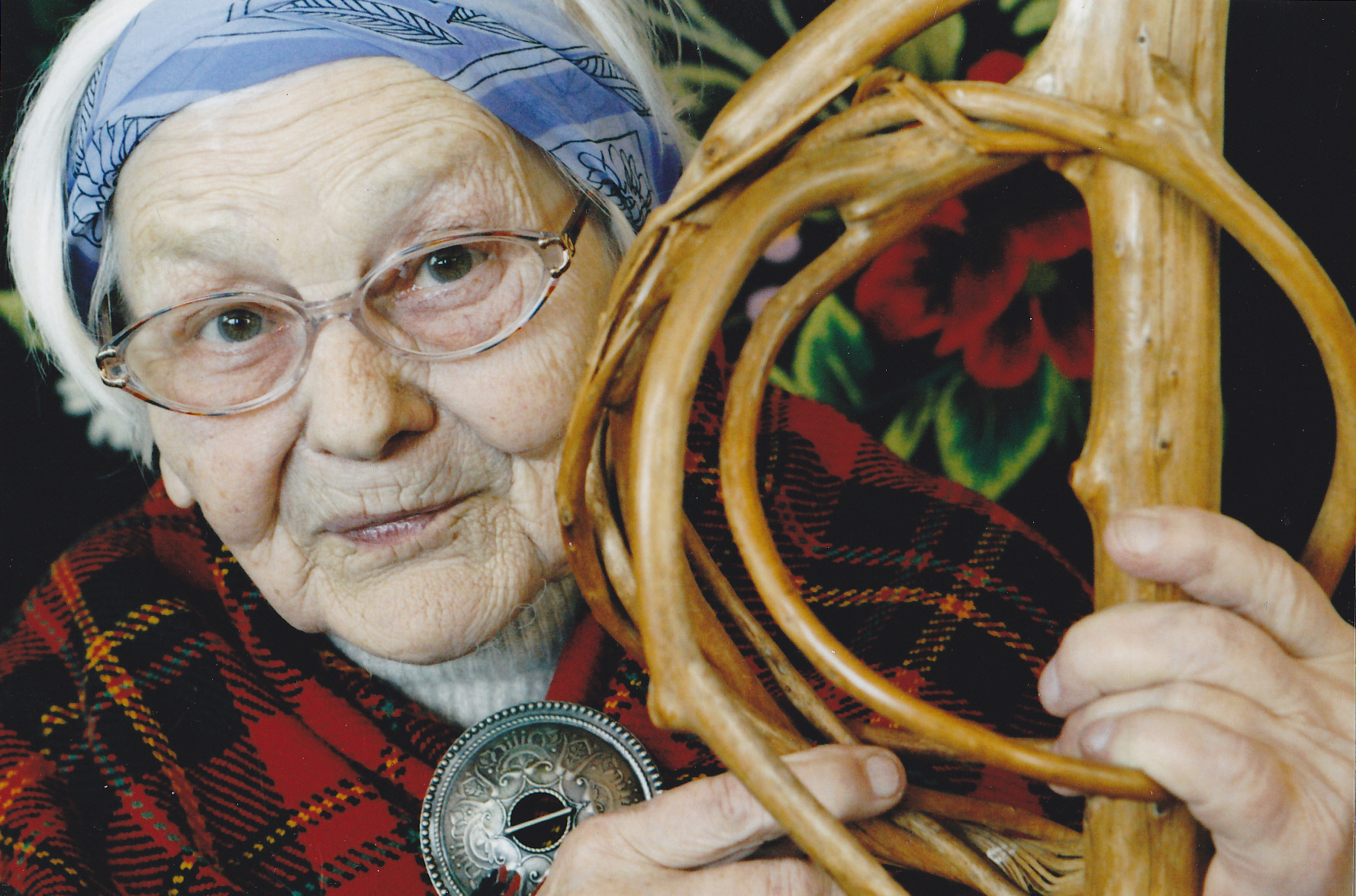
Helju Mikkel

Helju Mikkel (until 1936 Amberg, 1936–1948 Ambre, colloquially in Estonian Tantsumemm, Memm; 13 March 1925 – October 2017) was an Estonian folk dancer and choreographer.

Mikkel was born in Nõo, Tartu County. She was one of the founders of the dance festival Gaudeamus. She was a long-time leader of University of Tartu Folk Art Ensemble.

She choreographed many new Estonian folk dances, e.g. Tedremäng, Vanaisa polka, Otsapandjatse, Lina, Kullaketrajad, Kiigemäng, and Kaksteist kapukat.

Awards:

- 1964: Estonian SSR merited cultural personnel
- 2000: Order of the White Star, III class
