= Margus Leivo =

Estonian politician (1954–2019)

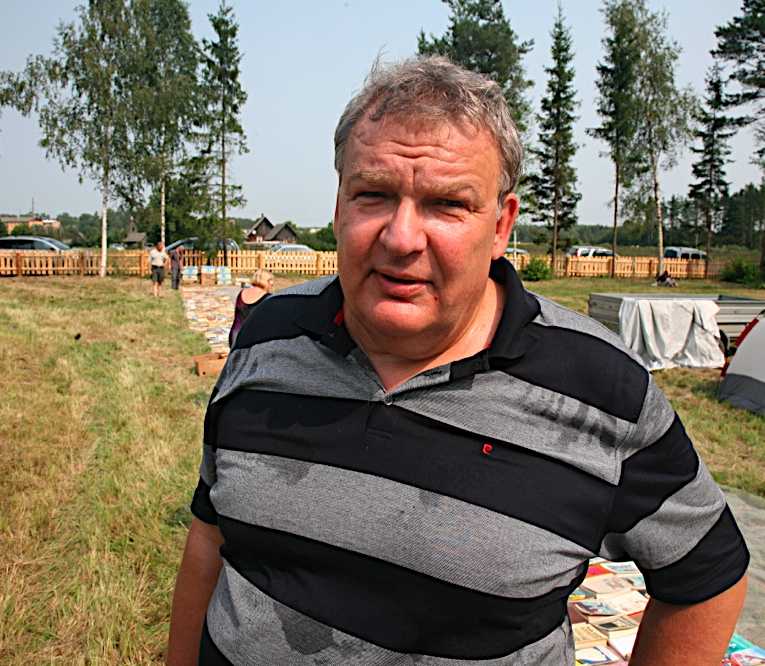
Leivo in 2010

Margus Leivo (28 May 1954, in Räpina – 21 August 2019) was an Estonian politician. He was a member of X Riigikogu. He was the Estonian Minister of the Interior from 2003 to 2005.

He was a member of the People's Union of Estonia party.
