= Richard Ritsing =

Estonian composer and conductor

Richard Ritsing (25 March 1903 – 8 July 1994) is an Estonian composer, choral conductor. He composed mainly a cappella choral music.

== Biography ==
Ritsing was born in Räpina. In 1929 he graduated from Tartu University in philosophy. He has studied several musical disciplines at Tartu Music School.

1934-1957 he was the music teacher at the Tartu University. 1945-1980 he taught choral conducting at the Heino Eller Tartu Music School.

1950-1980 he was the artistic leader of Estonian Song Celebrations, and in 1980, 1985 and 1990, Honorary Leader. He was one of the key persons to start student song festival, Gaudeamus.

Since 1944 he was a member of the Estonian Composers' Union.
