= Maximilian Theodor Buch =

Baltic German physician and author (1850–1920)

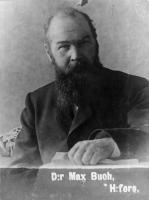
Max Buch.

Maximilian Theodor (Max) Buch (29 August 1850 in Räpina, Livonian Governorate, Russian Empire – 6 January 1920 in Lappeenranta, Finland) was a Baltic German-born Finnish physician, ethnographer, court councillor, Finnish nationalist, and advocate of public education. His extensive literary production is mainly in German, but he also published in Swedish and Russian.

== Scientific studies ==
He made ethnographic observations among the Udmurts (Votyaks) and published the study Die Wotjäken: Eine Ethnologische Studie in 1882. He also wrote on Estonian folk religion.

== Scientific theories ==
Buch is also noted for his controversial studies in curing alcoholism by means of strychnine.

== Public education ==
Buch authored the pamphlet, Finnland und seine Nationalitätenfrage ("Finland and Her Nationality Question"), in which he detailed the low availability of schooling and the emphasis of a Swedish language on Finns. In a summary by Peter Kropotkin, "Out of 300,000 children of school age in 1881, only 26,900 received instruction in 576 permanent schools, of which 134 were Swedish."
