= Räpina =

Town in Estonia

Räpina Räpinä (Võro)
- Town
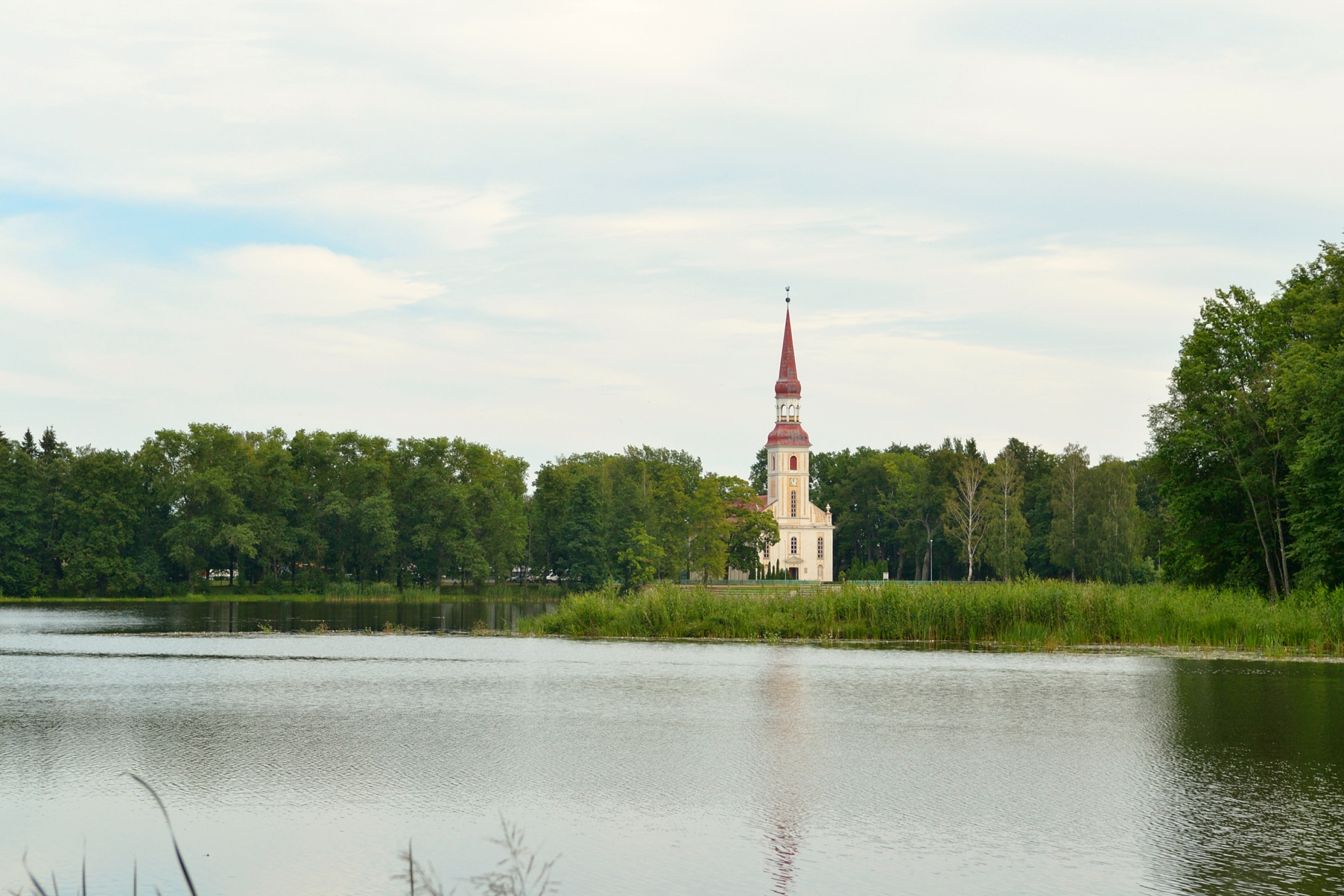

- Location in Estonia
- Coordinates: 58°5′52″N 27°27′51″E
- Country: Estonia
- County: Põlva County
- Municipality: Räpina Parish

Population (2026)
  - Total: 2,002
  - Rank: 36th

Räpina (Võro: Räpinä, German: Rappin) is a town in Põlva County, Estonia. Räpina was the administrative centre of Räpina raion from 1950 until 1961, and currently it is the administrative seat of Räpina Parish. The oldest commercial enterprise in Räpina is a paper factory that opened in 1734.

== Gallery ==
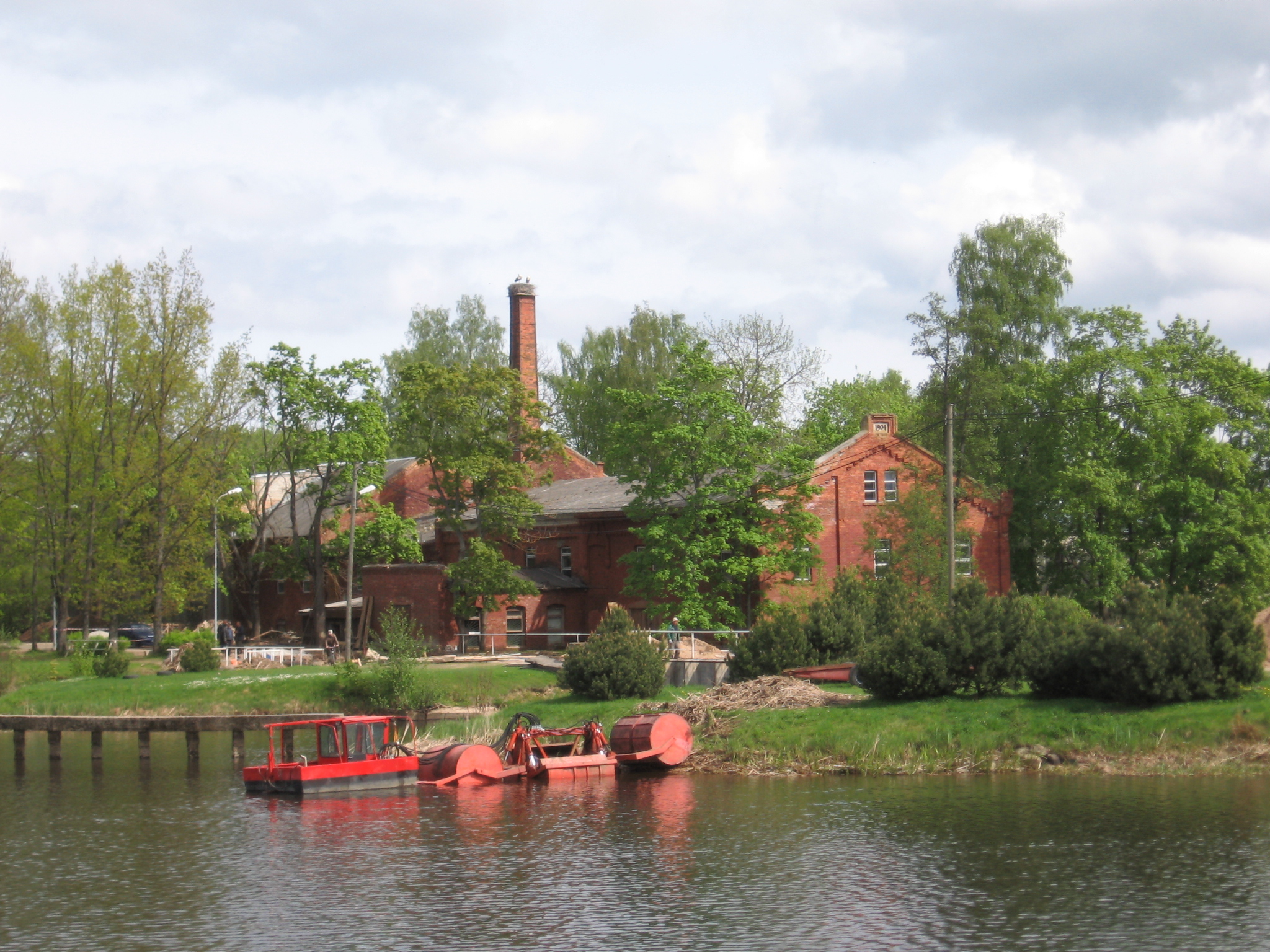
Räpina paper mill on Lake Räpina

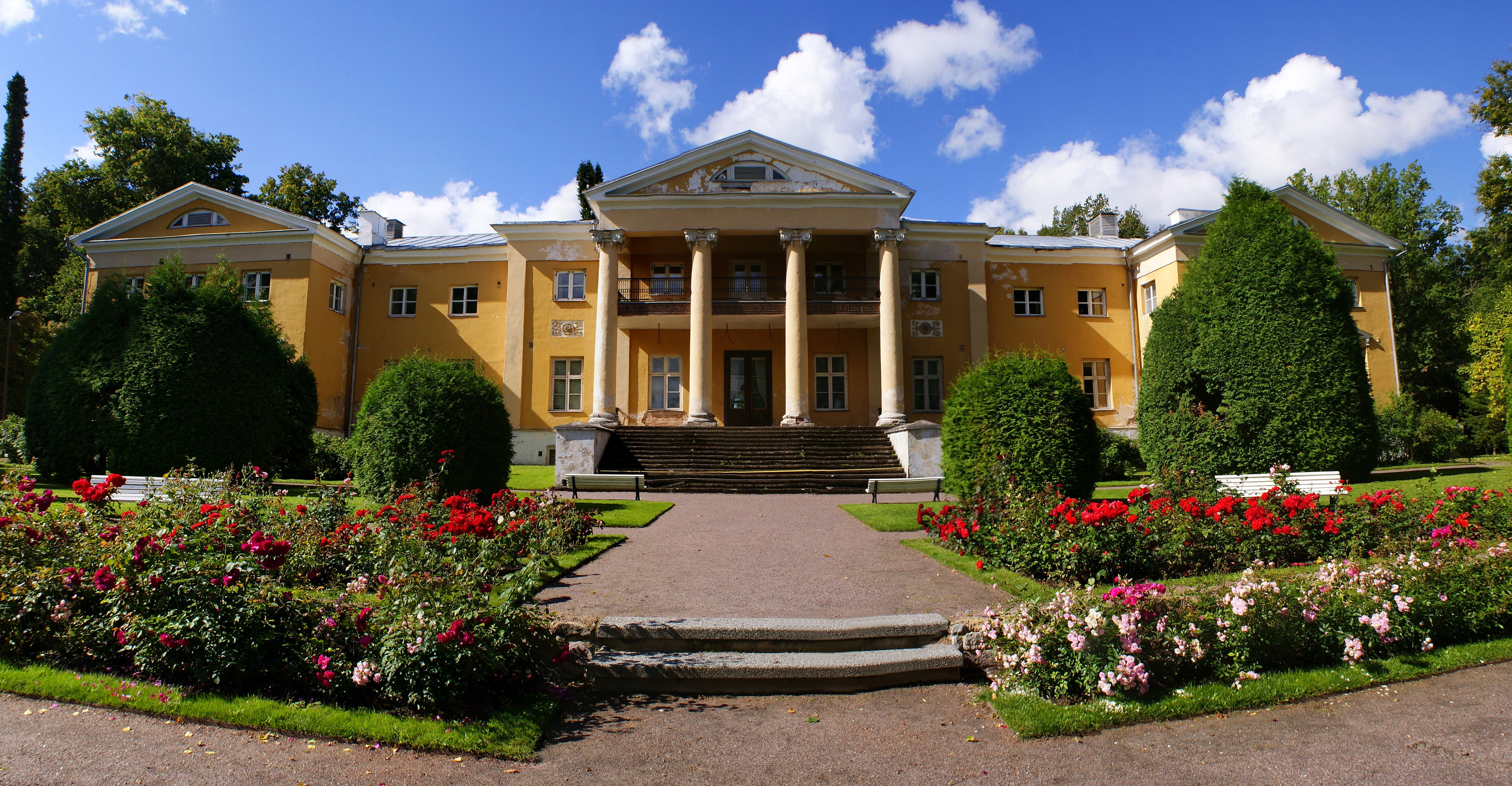
Räpina manor

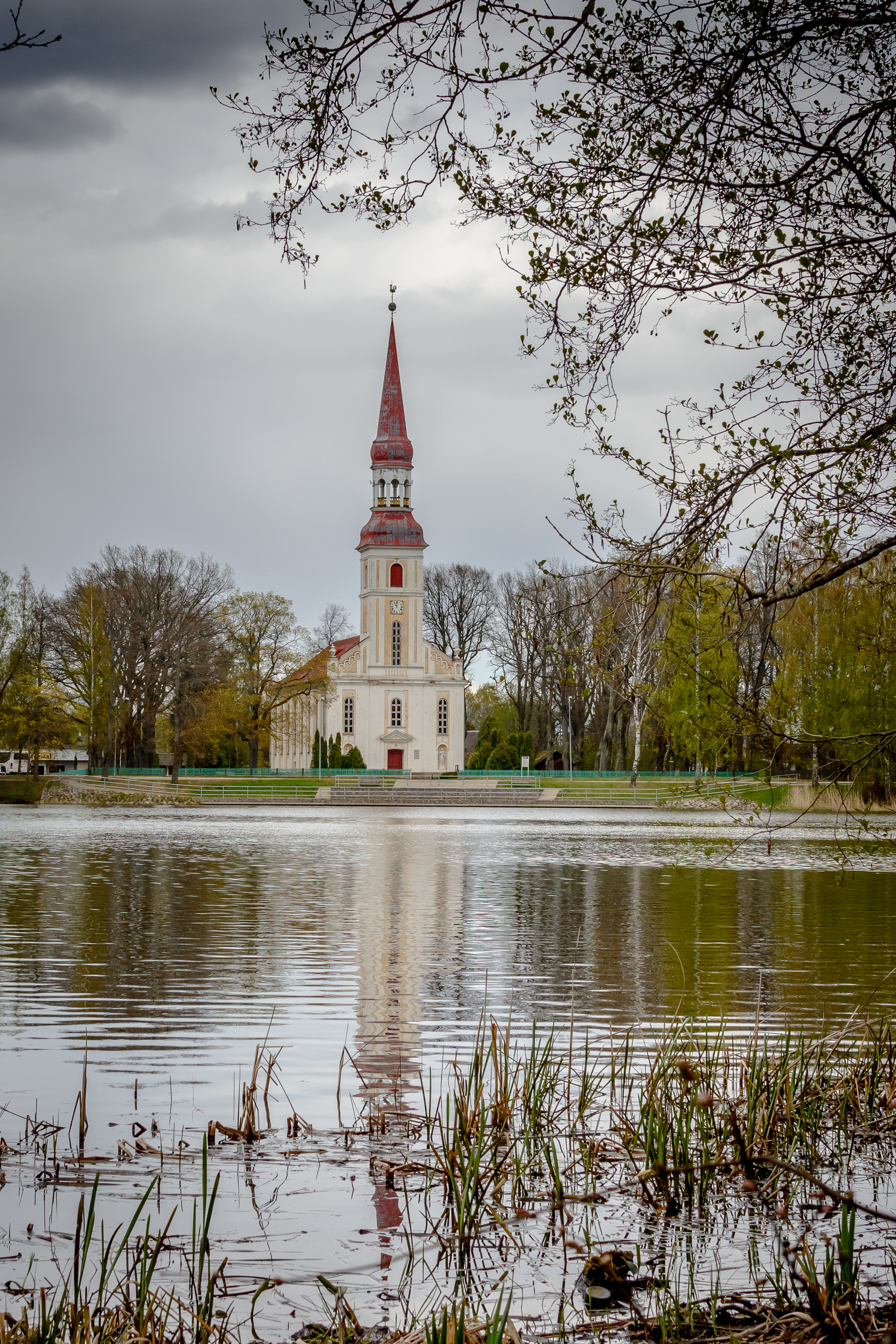
Räpina church on Lake Räpina

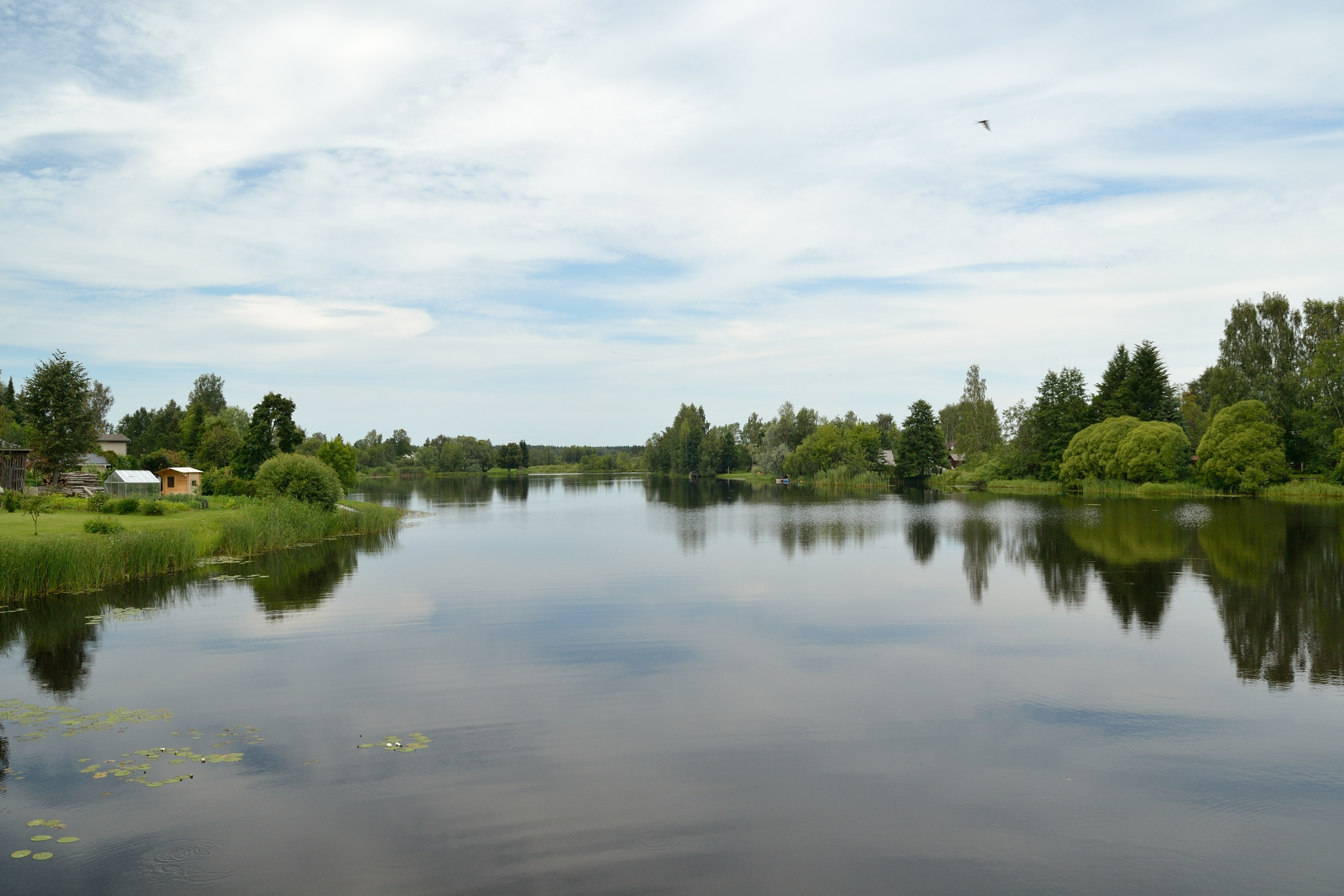
Lake Räpina

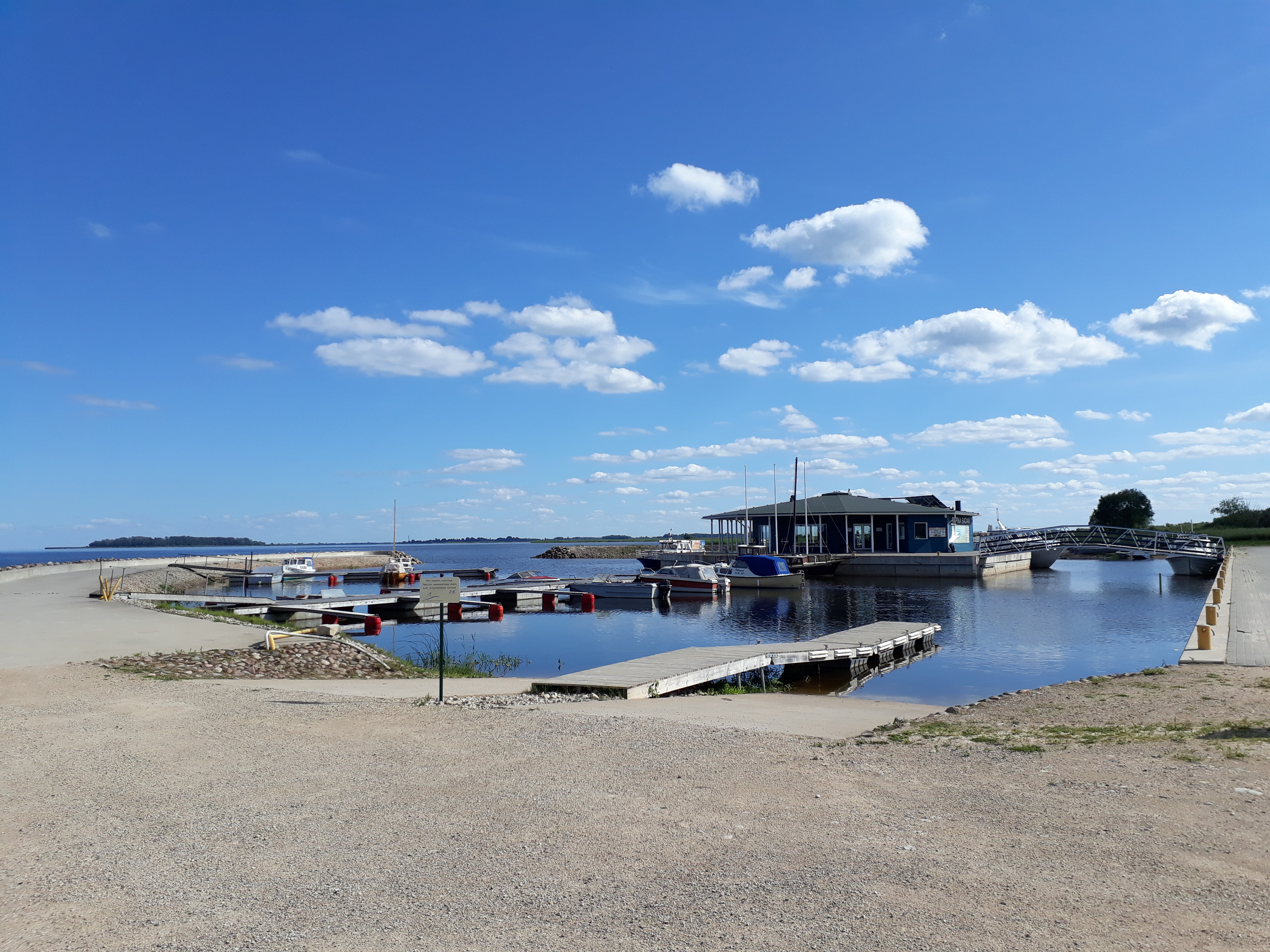
Räpina harbour on Lake Peipus

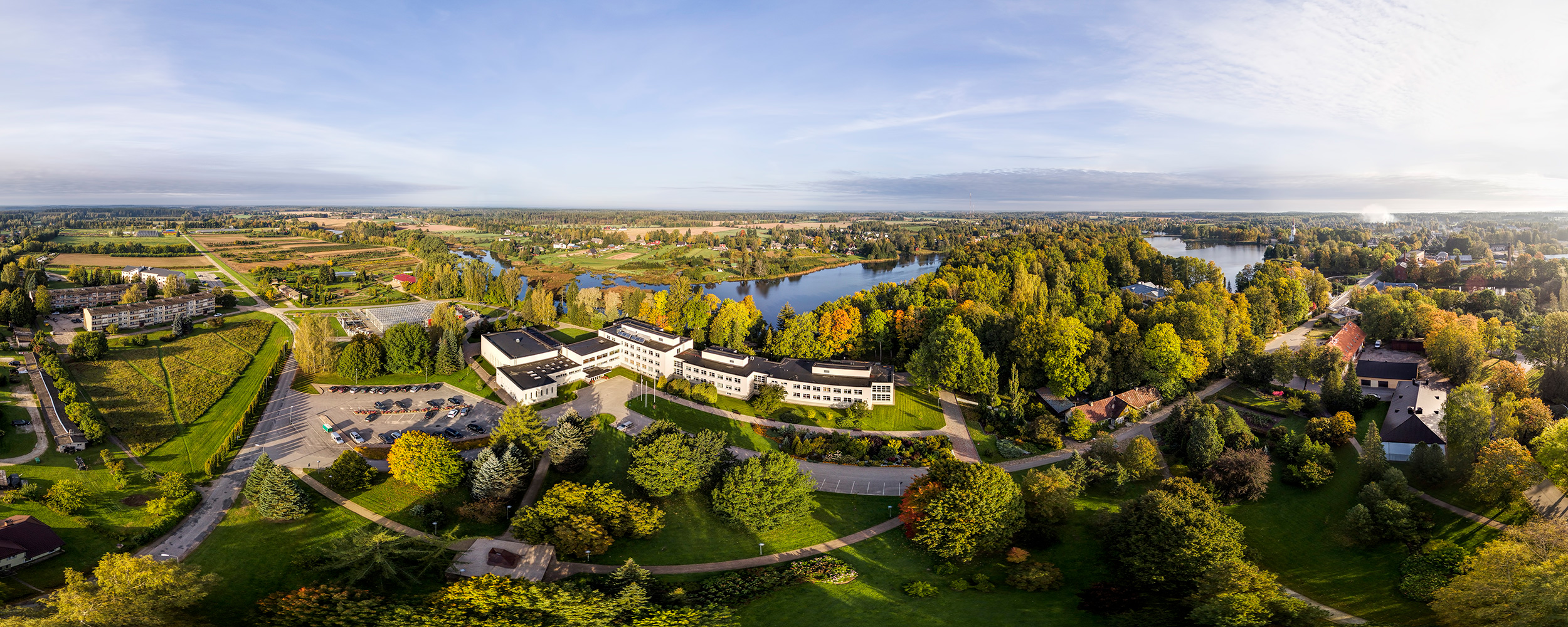
Räpina School of Horticulture

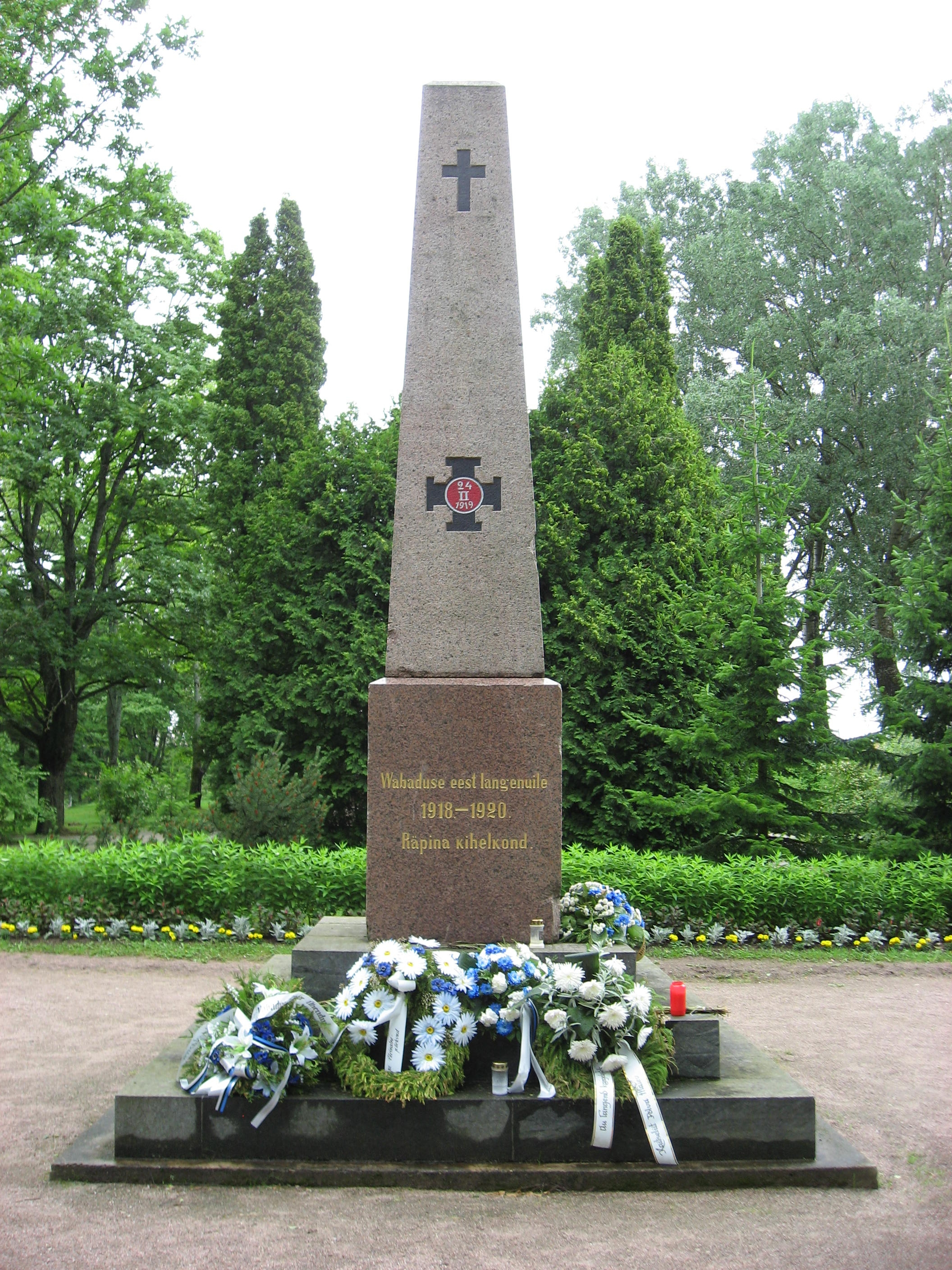
Monument to the Estonian War of Independence in Räpina

== Notable people ==
- Maximilian Theodor Buch (1850–1920), a Baltic German-born Finnish physician, ethnographer, court councillor and Finnish nationalist
- Richard Ritsing (1903–1994), composer of A cappella choral music and a choral conductor.
- Paul Haavaoks (1924–1983), poet and writer
- Enno Ootsing (born 1940), artist and academic
- Leonhard Lapin (born 1947), architect, artist, historian, poet and academic
- Irja Lutsar (born 1954), microbiologist, virologist, politician, and member of the XV Riigikogu.
- Margus Leivo (1954–2019), politician, member of X Riigikogu and Minister of the Interior, 2003 to 2005.
- Meelis Mälberg (born 1970), politician, member of X, XII and XIII Riigikogu and the mayor of Räpina, 1998 to 2002.
- Aapo Ilves (born 1970), poet, writer, artist and musician
- Urmas Klaas (born 1971), historian, journalist and politician; Mayor of Tartu from 2014.
