= Gaudeamus (festival) =

Student festival held in Baltic states

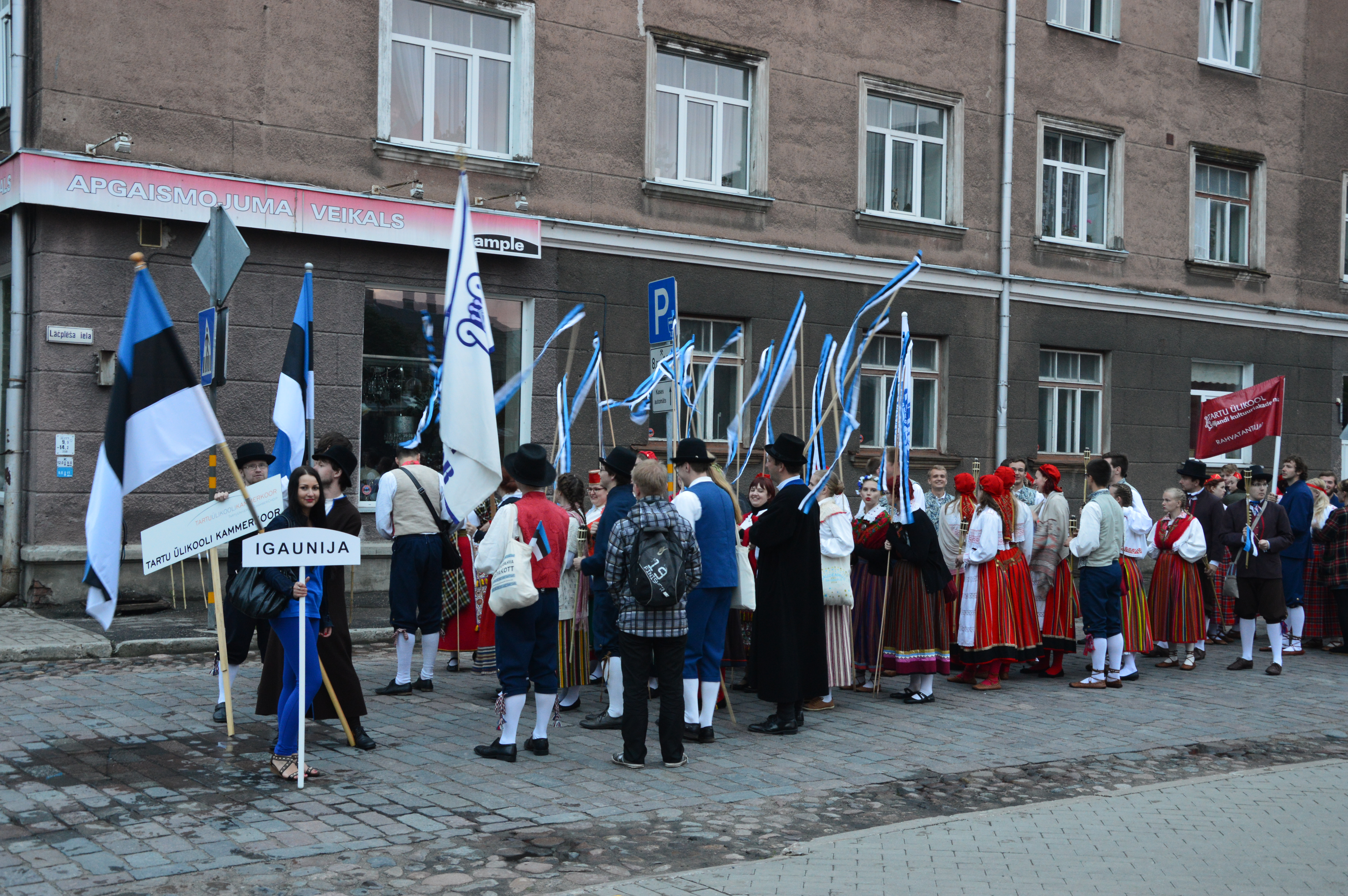
Estonian choirs during procession in 2014 in Daugavpils

Gaudeamus is a song and dance festival attended by students from the Baltic states.

The first festival took place in July 1956 in Tartu, with 2,500 students participating.

== Festivals ==
- 1956 in Tartu
- 1958 in Riga
- 1967 in Tartu
- 1968 in Vilnius
- 1971 in Riga
- 1974 in Tartu
- 1984 in Tallinn
- 1988 in Vilnius
- 1995 in Tartu
- 1999 in Vilnius
- 2004 in Tartu
- 2006 in Vilnius
- 2011 in Daugavplis
- 2014 in Daugavpils
- 2018 in Tartu
- 2022 in Vilnius
- 2026 in Riga

== See also ==
- Baltic song festivals
