= Meeksi Parish =

Former municipality of Estonia

Coordinates: 58°13′N 27°26′E

Meeksi Parish Meeksi vald (in Estonian) Miiksi vald (in Võro)
- Former municipality of Estonia
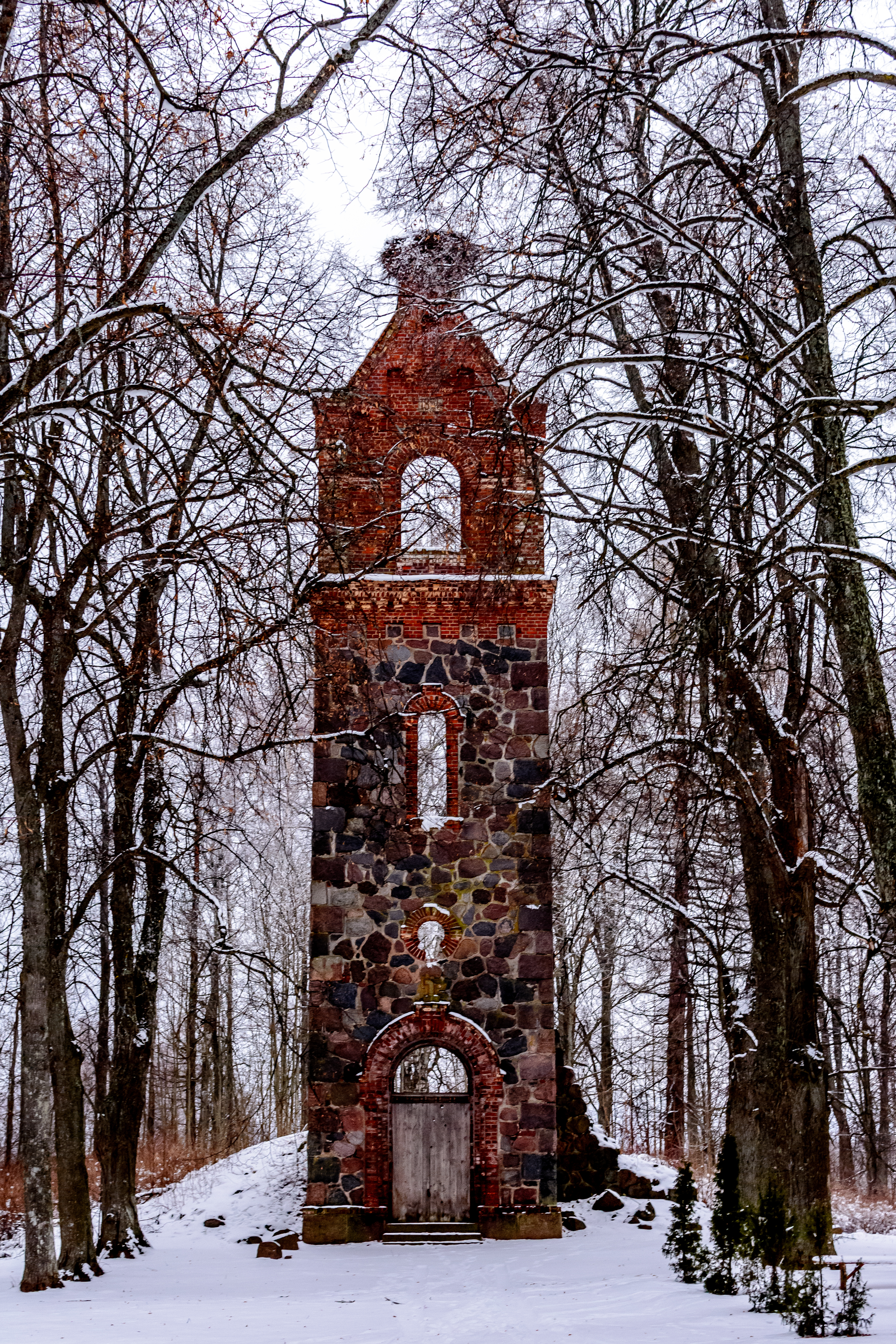
- Mehikoorma church

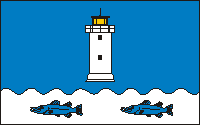
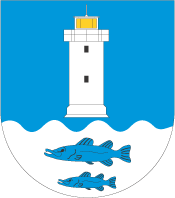
- Flag Coat of arms

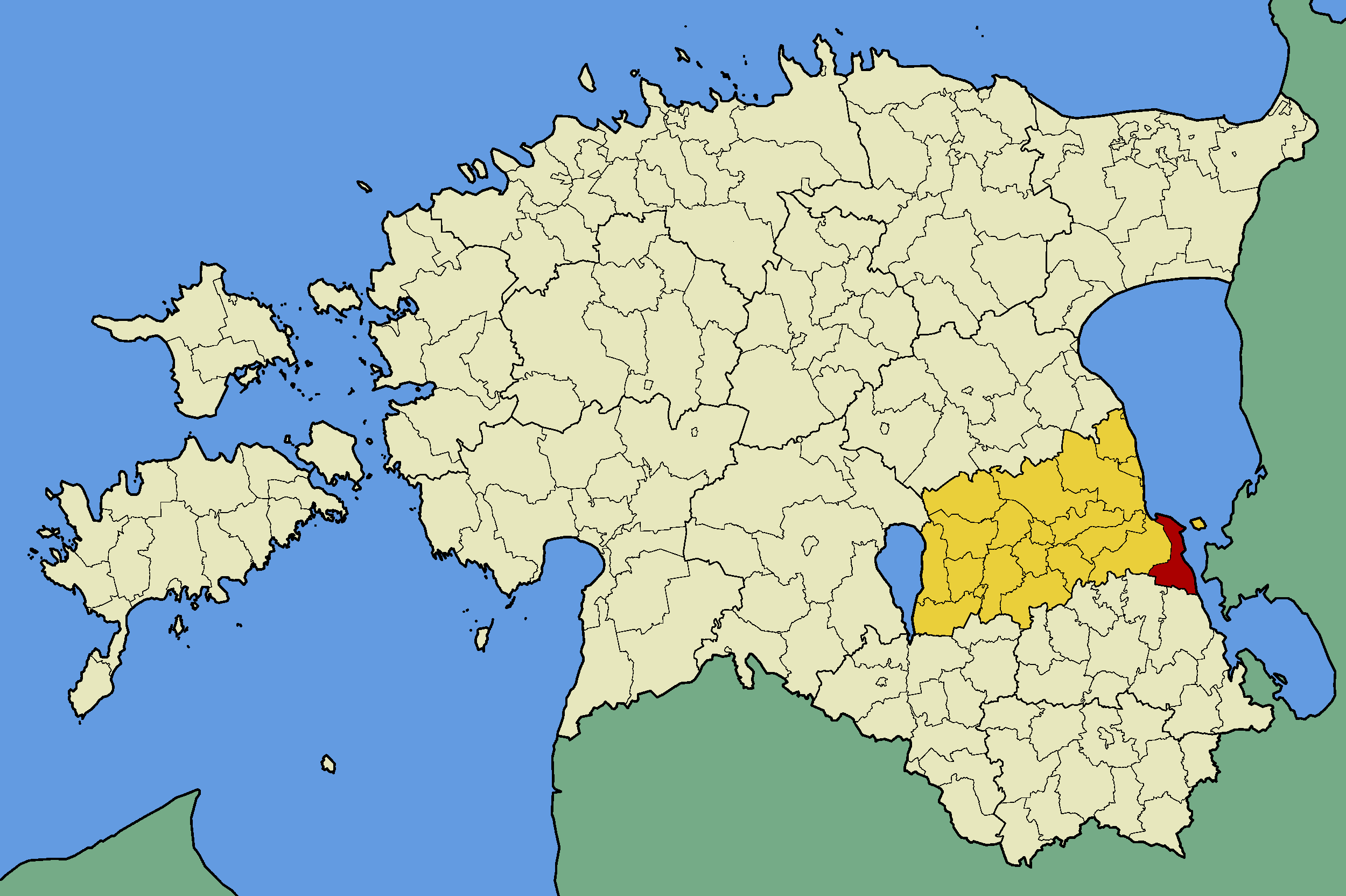
- Meeksi Parish within Tartu County.
- Country: Estonia
- County: Tartu County
- Administrative centre: Meeksi
- Website: www.meeksi.ee

Meeksi Parish (Estonian: Meeksi vald; Võro: Miiksi vald) was a rural municipality in Tartu County, Estonia. In 2017, Meeksi Parish, Räpina Parish and Veriora Parish were merged and a new municipality Räpina Parish was formed within Põlva County.

== Settlements ==
Small borough

Mehikoorma

Villages

Aravu - Haavametsa - Järvselja - Jõepera - Meeksi - Meerapalu - Parapalu - Rõka - Sikakurmu

== Gallery ==
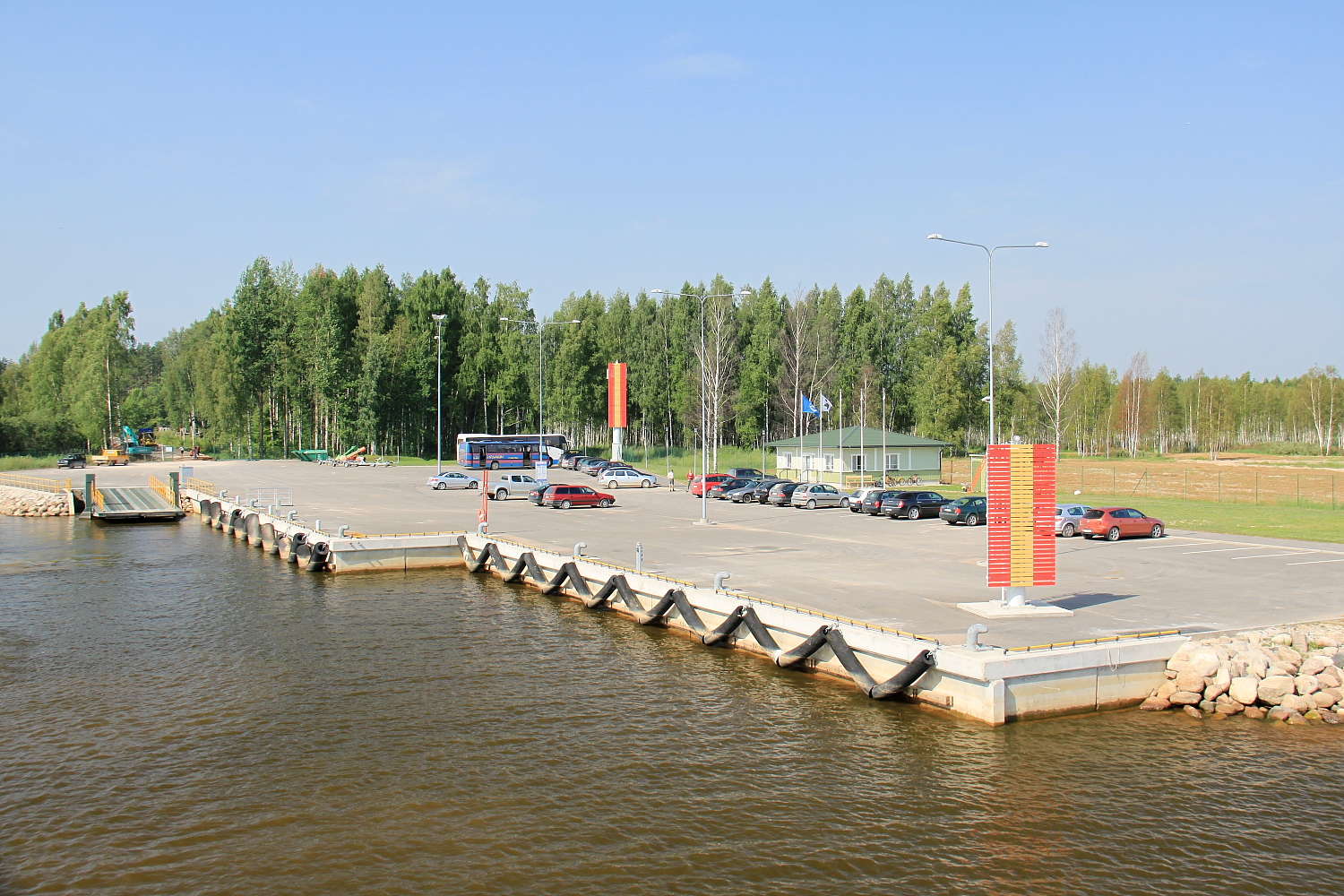
Laaksaare harbour in Parapalu connects the island of Piirissaar with mainland.

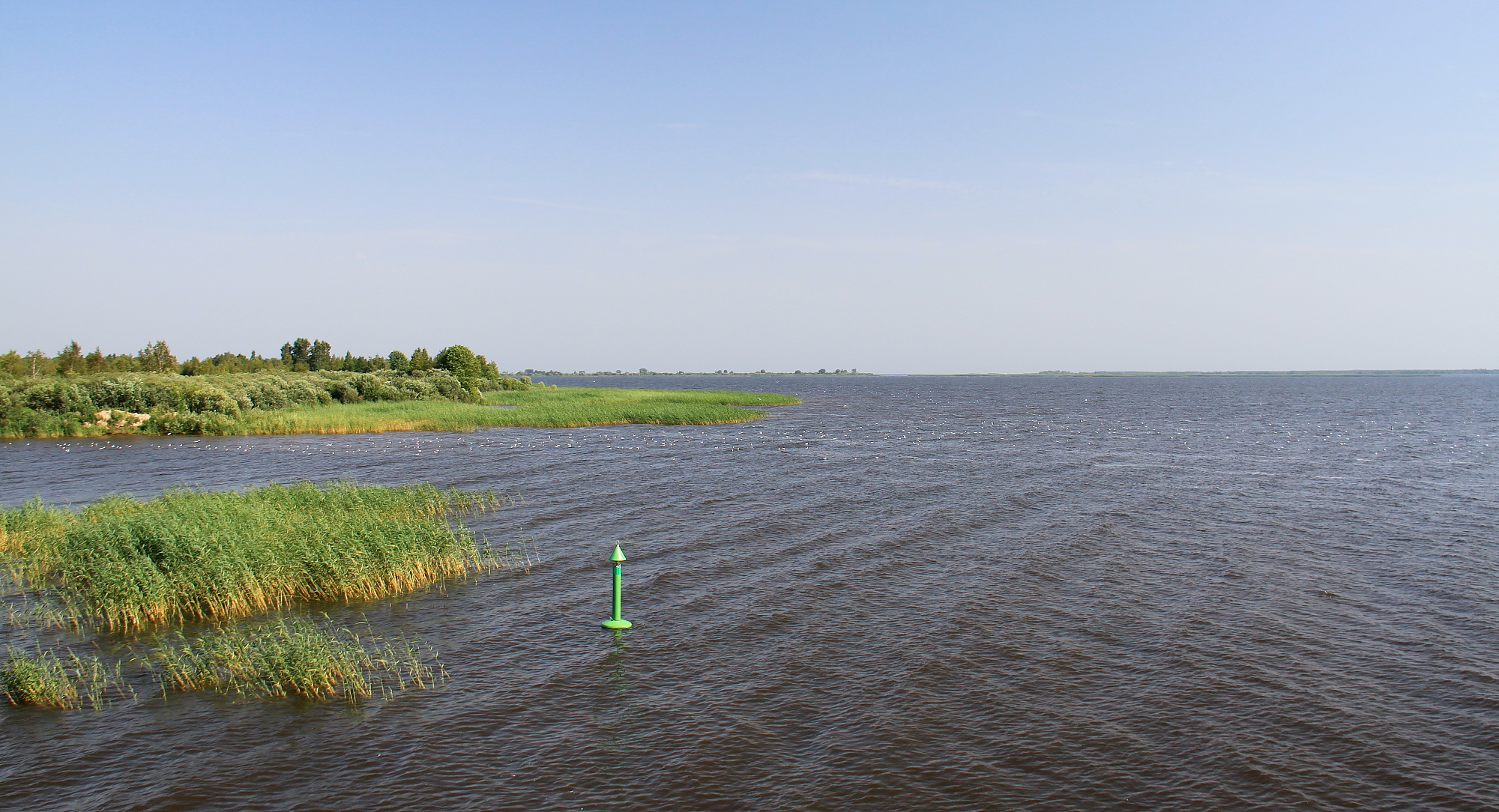
Lake Peipus (Lämmijärv) near Laaksaare.

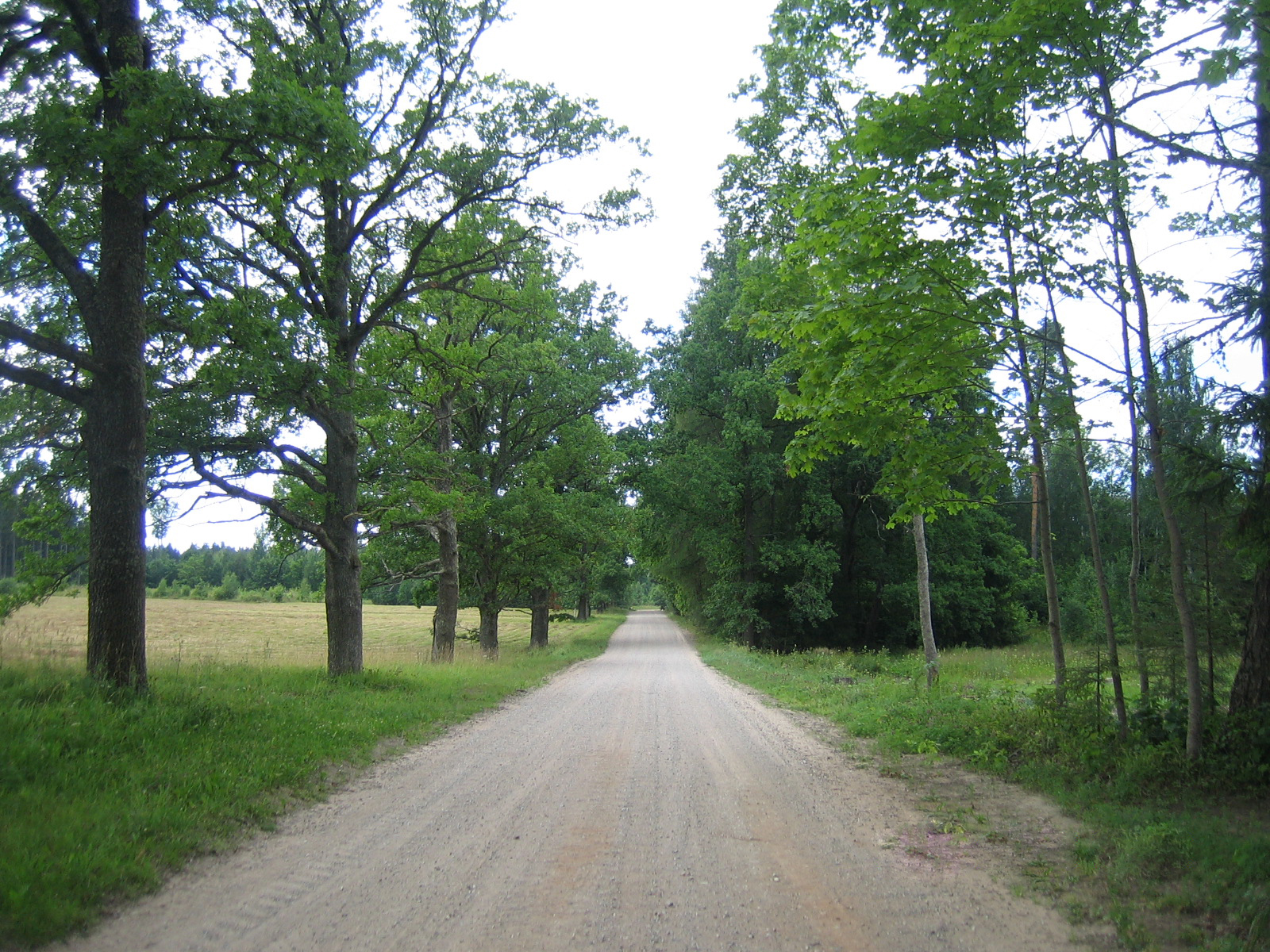
Oak alley in Rõka.

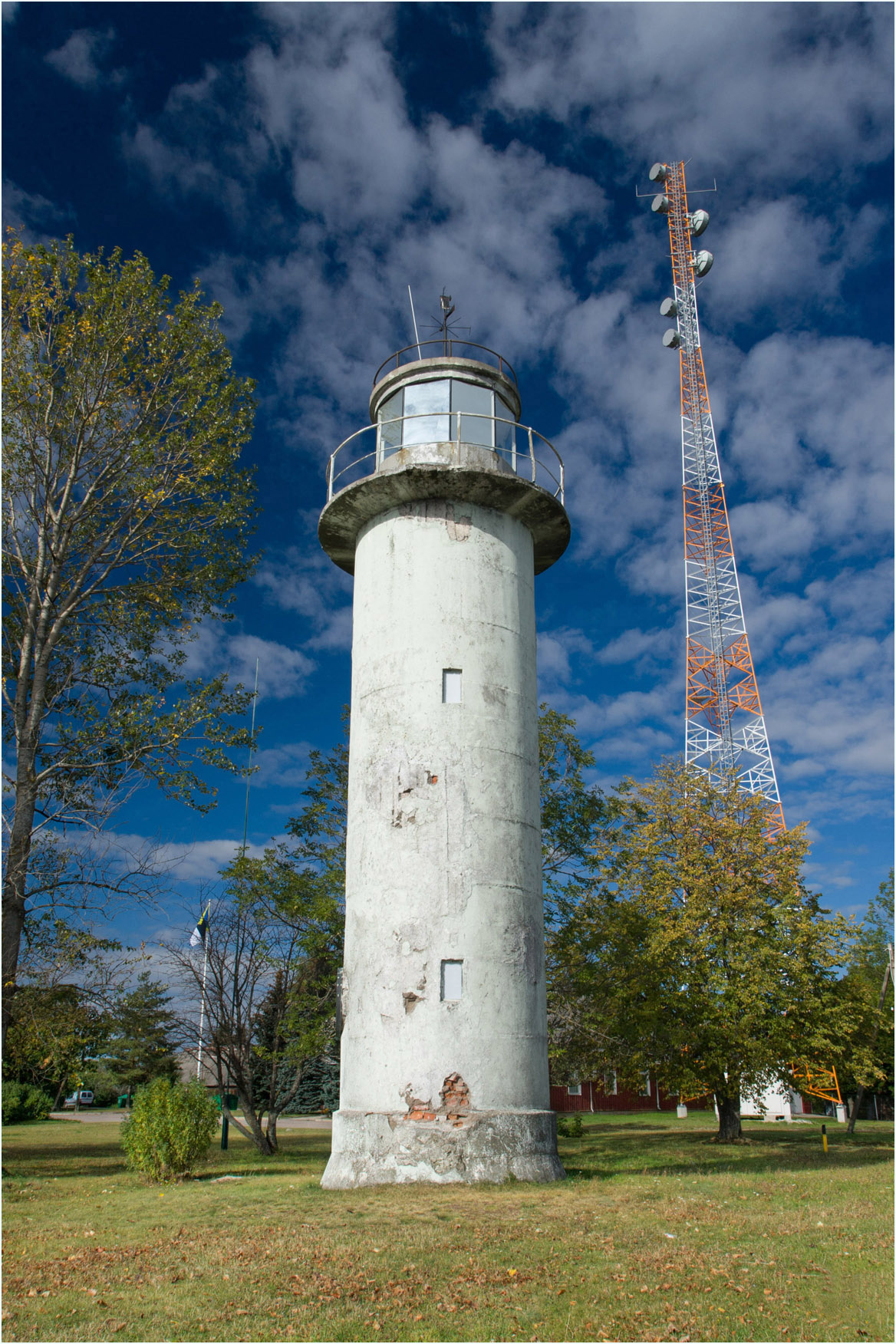
Mehikoorma lighthouse.

== See also ==
- Järvselja Nature Reserve
- Mehikoorma Lighthouse
- Mehikoorma Umbjärv
