= Saare =

Saare may refer to:

Places in Estonia

- Saare County (also known as Saaremaa), one of 15 counties of Estonia
- Saaremaa Parish, municipality in Saare County
- Saare Parish, former municipality in Jõgeva County
- Saare, Lääne County (Swedish: Lyckholm), village in Lääne-Nigula Parish, Lääne County
- Saare, Pärnu County, village in Lääneranna Parish, Pärnu County
- Saare, Tartu Parish, village in Tartu Parish, Tartu County, on the island of Piirissaar
- Saare, Elva Parish, village in Elva Parish, Tartu County

Other

- Saare (snack), a snack given to a groom after wedding

== See also ==
- Sääre (disambiguation), several places in Estonia
