= Maimu Berg =

Estonian writer, journalist and politician

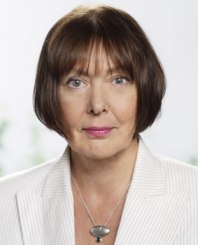
Maimu Berg in 2014

Maimu Berg (born August 27, 1945, in Tallinn) is an Estonian writer, critic, translator, and journalist. She was a member of the Riigikogu, elected in 2011.

Berg graduated from secondary school in Tallinn in 1968, and took her degree in Estonian language and literature from the University of Tartu. She worked in the university library from 1969 to 1974, and edited the magazine Siluett from 1974 to 1990. She also worked as a journalist for various publications. She was a member of the People's Union of Estonia from 2002 to 2006, whereupon she became a member of the Social Democratic Party. She served on the Tallinn City Council from 2007 to 2009. She was nominated to stand for Parliament in 2003 and 2007, and for the European Parliament in 2004. Berg was married for a time to the writer Vaino Vahing, by whom she had a daughter, the judge Julia Laffranque.

She has written novels and short stories.

== Controversy over sexual child abuse by a member of Estonian Writer's Union in 2020 ==
In a 2020 discussion over the membership of Peeter Helme, who was convicted of sexually luring a child by the first instance in the Estonian court system, in the Estonian Writer's Union, Maimu Berg opposed the expulsion of Peeter Helme.
