= Umbjärv (Meeksi) =

Lake in Estonia

- Location within Estonia
- Coordinates: 58.2429297°N 27.4552251°E
- Basin countries: Estonia
- Max. length: 640 meters (2,100 ft)
- Surface area: 13.0 hectares (32 acres)
- Average depth: 2.0 meters (6 ft 7 in)
- Max. depth: 5.0 meters (16.4 ft)
- Shore length^{1}: 1,750 meters (5,740 ft)
- Surface elevation: 31.0 meters (101.7 ft)
- ^{1} Shore length is not a well-defined measure.

Umbjärv (also Mehikoorma Umbjärv) is a lake in Estonia. It is located in the village of Meeksi in Räpina Parish, Põlva County.

== Physical description ==
The lake has an area of 13.0 hectares (32 acres). The lake has an average depth of 2.0 meters (6 ft 7 in) and a maximum depth of 5.0 meters (16.4 ft). It is 640 meters (2,100 ft) long, and its shoreline measures 1,750 meters (5,740 ft).

== Names ==
The name Umbjärv is derived from the Estonian common noun umbjärv 'endorheic lake, lake with no (surface inlet) or outlet' (cf. Finnish umpijärvi). The alternate name Mehikoorma Umbjärv, referring to the neighboring settlement of Mehikoorma, distinguishes the lake from other lakes named Umbjärv in Estonia—for example, Lüübnitsa Umbjärv about 20 kilometers (12 mi) to the southeast in the village of Beresje.

== See also ==
- List of lakes of Estonia
