= Vaino Vahing =

Estonian writer and psychiatrist (1940–2008)

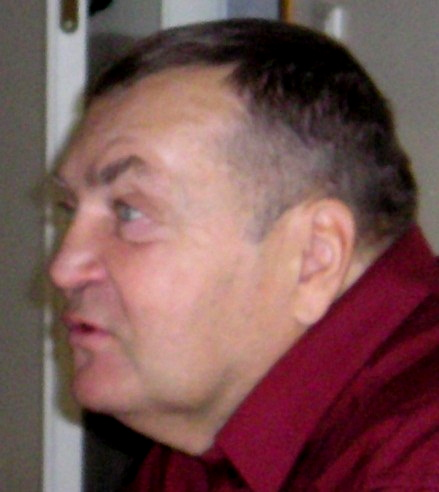
- Vahing in 2006
- Born: 15 February 1940; Aravu, Põlva County, Estonia
- Died: 23 March 2008 (aged 68); Tartu, Estonia
- Education: University of Tartu
- Occupations: Writer; prosaist; psychiatrist; playwright
- Spouse(s): Maimu Berg; Heli Vahing
- Children: Julia

Vaino Vahing (15 February 1940 – 23 March 2008) was an Estonian writer, prosaist, psychiatrist and playwright. Starting from 1973, he was a member of the Estonian Writers' Union.

== Early life ==
Vlahing was born in Aravu, Põlva County. In 1963, he attended the University of Tartu, Faculty of Medicine, qualifying as a Doctor of Medicine in 1969.

- 1963–1965 – head of department and deputy of the doctor-director at the psycho-neurological clinic in Jämejala
- 1965–1967 – doctor at the Tartu psychiatry clinic
- 1967–1975 – expert in forensic psychiatry
- 1968–1981 – lecturer and later docent at the Institute of Psychiatry of the University of Tartu

Vahing wrote many articles about psychiatry and literature, including novels, books, and plays influenced by psychiatric and autobiographical factors.

He acted in several Estonian films. He died in Tartu.

== List of works ==
- Lugu (Perioodika 1970)
- Kaemus (Eesti Raamat 1972)
- Sina (Perioodika 1973)
- E me ipso (Eesti Raamat 1990)
- Kaunimad jutud (Ilmamaa 1995)
- Thespis (Ilmamaa 1997)
- Machiavelli kirjad tütrele (Eesti Raamat 1990)
- Mängud ja kõnelused (Eesti Keele Sihtasutus 2002)
- Hermaküla
- Noor Unt (Perioodika 2004)
- Vaimuhaiguse müüt (Ilmamaa 2005)
- Näitleja (Vagabund 2006)
- Päevaraamat I (2006)
- Päevaraamat II (2007)

== Honors ==
- Estonian White Cross, fourth category

== Personal ==
Vahing was married to writer Maimu Berg and actress Heli Vahing. From his marriage to Berg, he had a daughter, Julia Laffranque, a former justice in the Supreme Court of Estonia and current European Court of Human Rights judge.
