= Free Air Humidity Manipulation =

Large-scale field experiment in Estonia

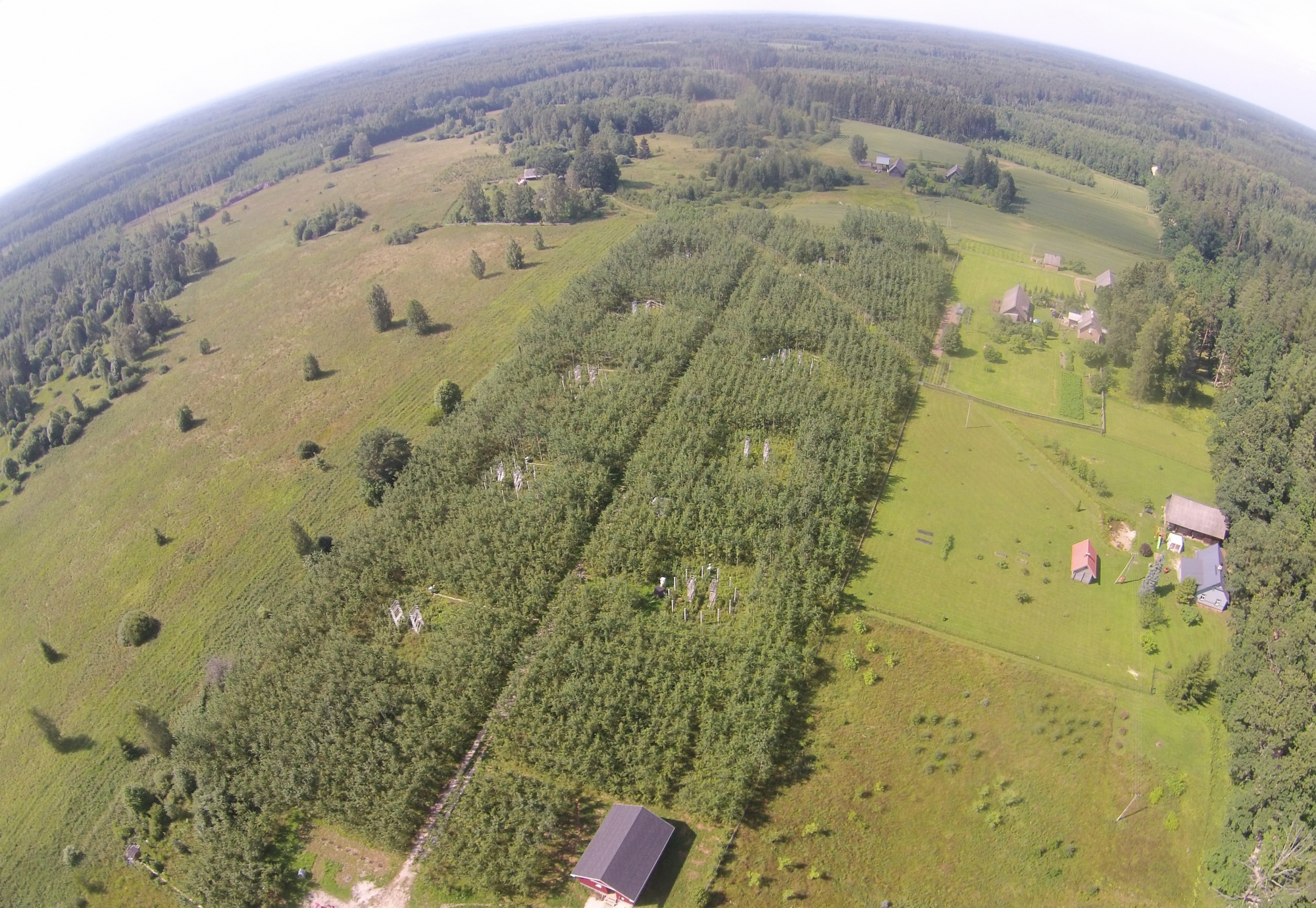
FAHM experimental area

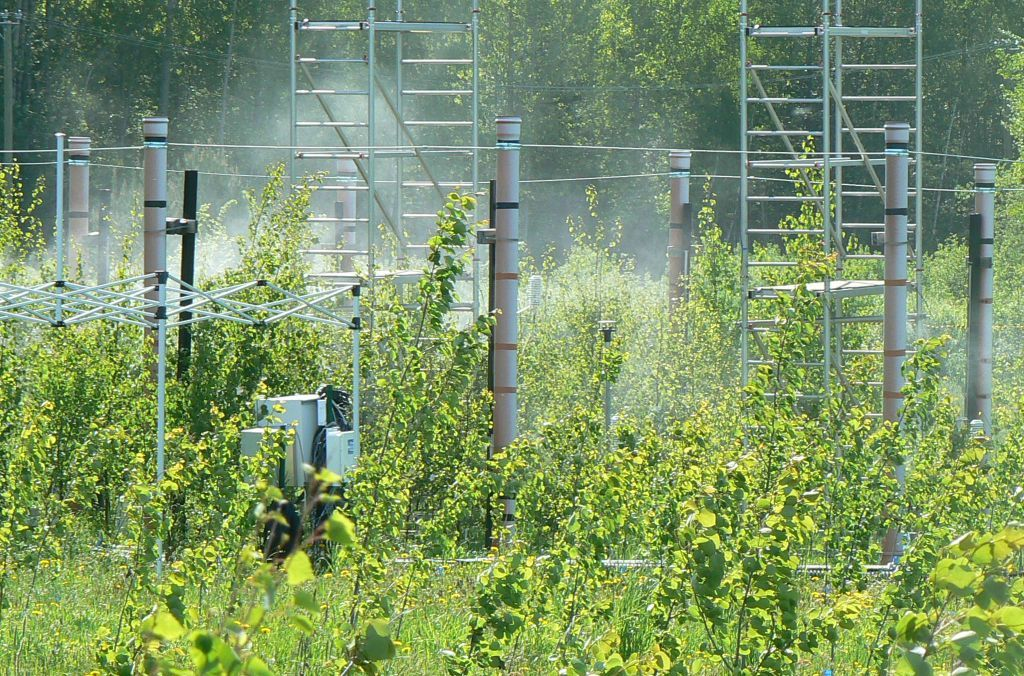
One of the humidification plots

Free Air Humidity Manipulation (FAHM) experiment is a large-scale field experiment in Estonia,

FAHM was established in 2006 by a group of plant biologists (ecophysiologists and applied ecologists) of the University of Tartu, led by Olevi Kull, to investigate the long term effects of increasing air humidity on tree performance and on the functioning of the deciduous forest ecosystem. The design of the FAHM experiment is based on the Free Air Carbon dioxide Enrichment (FACE) technology.

FAHM (58°14′N, 27°18′E) is located within the Järvselja Training and Experimental Forest District in the village of Rõka, Tartu county, FAHM infrastructure enables to increase air relative humidity up to 18% unit above ambient level (long-term mean increase 7%).
