= Selgjärv =

Lake in Estonia

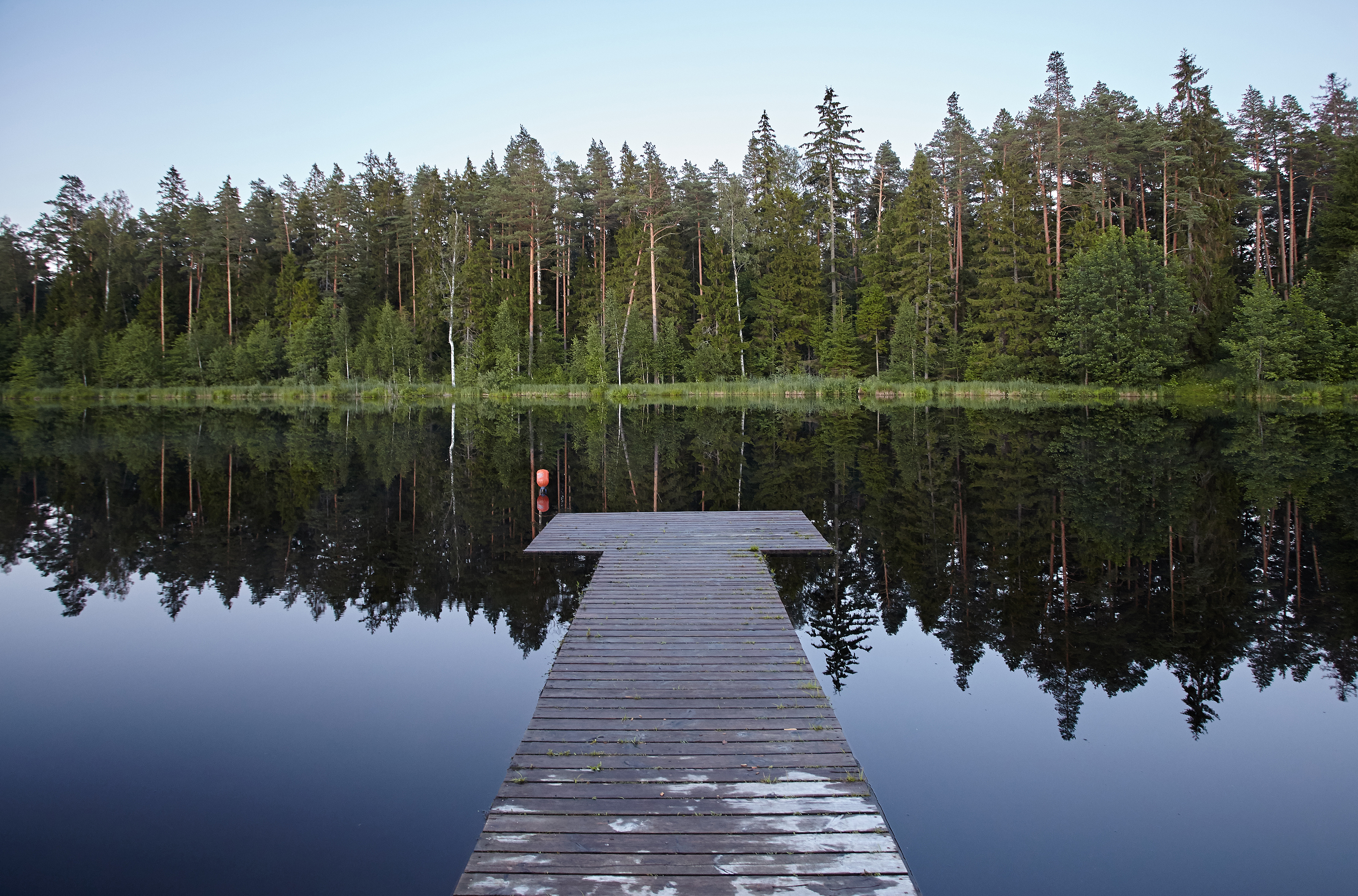

- Location within Estonia
- Coordinates: 58.26778°N 27.30722°E
- Basin countries: Estonia
- Max. length: 490 meters (1,610 ft)
- Max. width: 90 meters (300 ft)
- Surface area: 1.9 hectares (4.7 acres)
- Shore length^{1}: 1,060 meters (3,480 ft)
- Surface elevation: 34.4 meters (113 ft)
- ^{1} Shore length is not a well-defined measure.

Selgjärv (also known as Järvselja järv or Järveselja järv) is a lake in Estonia. It is located in the village of Järvselja in Kastre Parish, Tartu County.

== Physical description ==
The lake has an area of 1.9 hectares (4.7 acres). It is 490 meters (1,610 ft) long, and its shoreline measures 1,060 meters (3,480 ft).

== See also ==
- List of lakes of Estonia
