= Tooni =

Village in Estonia

- Village
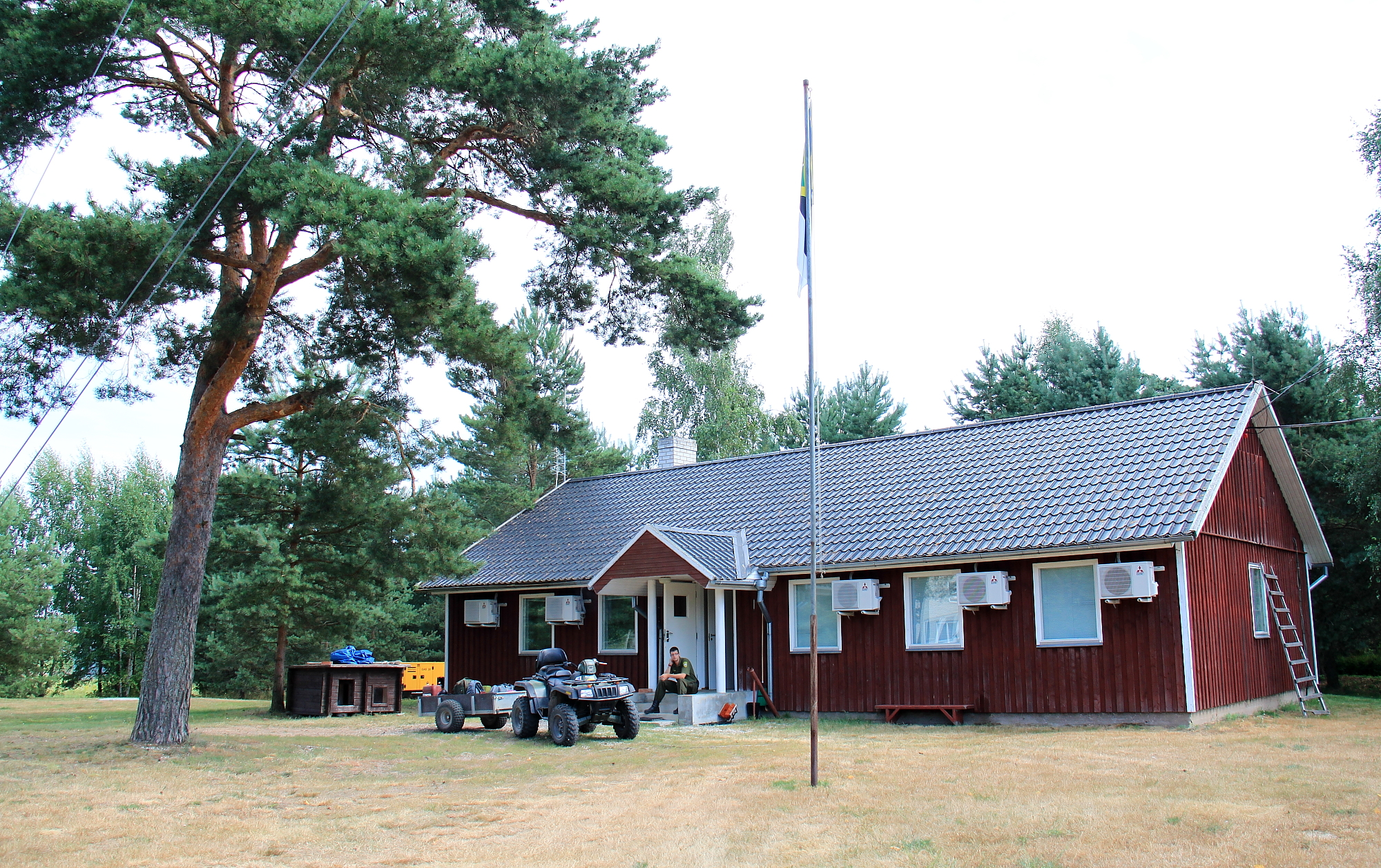
- Estonian Border Guard in Tooni

- Location within Estonia
- Coordinates: 58.3789°N 27.5214°E
- Country: Estonia
- County: Tartu County
- Parish: Tartu Parish
- Time zone: UTC+2 (EET)
  - Summer (DST): UTC+3 (EEST)

Tooni is a village in Tartu Parish, Tartu County in Estonia. Tooni is one of the three villages located on the island of Piirissaar, the others being Piiri and Saare. As of 2020, the village has a population of 12. Prior to the 2017 administrative reform of local governments, Tooni was located in Piirissaare Parish and served as its administrative centre.
