= Aravu =

Village in Estonia

Coordinates: 58°14′N 27°23′E

- Village
- Interactive map of Aravu
- Country: Estonia
- County: Põlva County
- Parish: Räpina Parish
- Time zone: UTC+2 (EET)
  - Summer (DST): UTC+3 (EEST)

Aravu is a village in Räpina Parish, Põlva County in eastern Estonia. Before the 2017 administrative reform, it was located in Meeksi Parish.

Writer and psychiatrist Vaino Vahing (1940–2008) was born in Aravu.
