= Sikakurmu =

Village in Estonia

- Village
- Interactive map of Sikakurmu
- Coordinates: 58°14′04.5″N 27°18′27.7″E
- Country: Estonia
- County: Põlva County
- Parish: Räpina Parish

Population (2011)
  - Total: 16
- Time zone: UTC+2 (EET)
  - Summer (DST): UTC+3 (EEST)

Sikakurmu is a village in Räpina Parish, Põlva County in eastern Estonia. Before the 2017 administrative reform, it was located in Meeksi Parish.
