= Piiri, Tartu County =

Village in Estonia

- Village
- Location within Estonia
- Coordinates: 58.3831°N 27.5133°E
- Country: Estonia
- County: Tartu County
- Parish: Tartu Parish
- Time zone: UTC+2 (EET)
  - Summer (DST): UTC+3 (EEST)

Piiri is a village in Tartu Parish, Tartu County in Estonia. Piiri is one of the three villages located on the island of Piirissaar, the others being Tooni and Saare. As of 2020, the village has a population of 50. Prior to the 2017 administrative reform of local governments, Piiri was located in Piirissaare Parish.
