= Piirissaare Parish =

Former municipality of Estonia

Piirissaare Parish Piirissaare vald
- Former municipality of Estonia
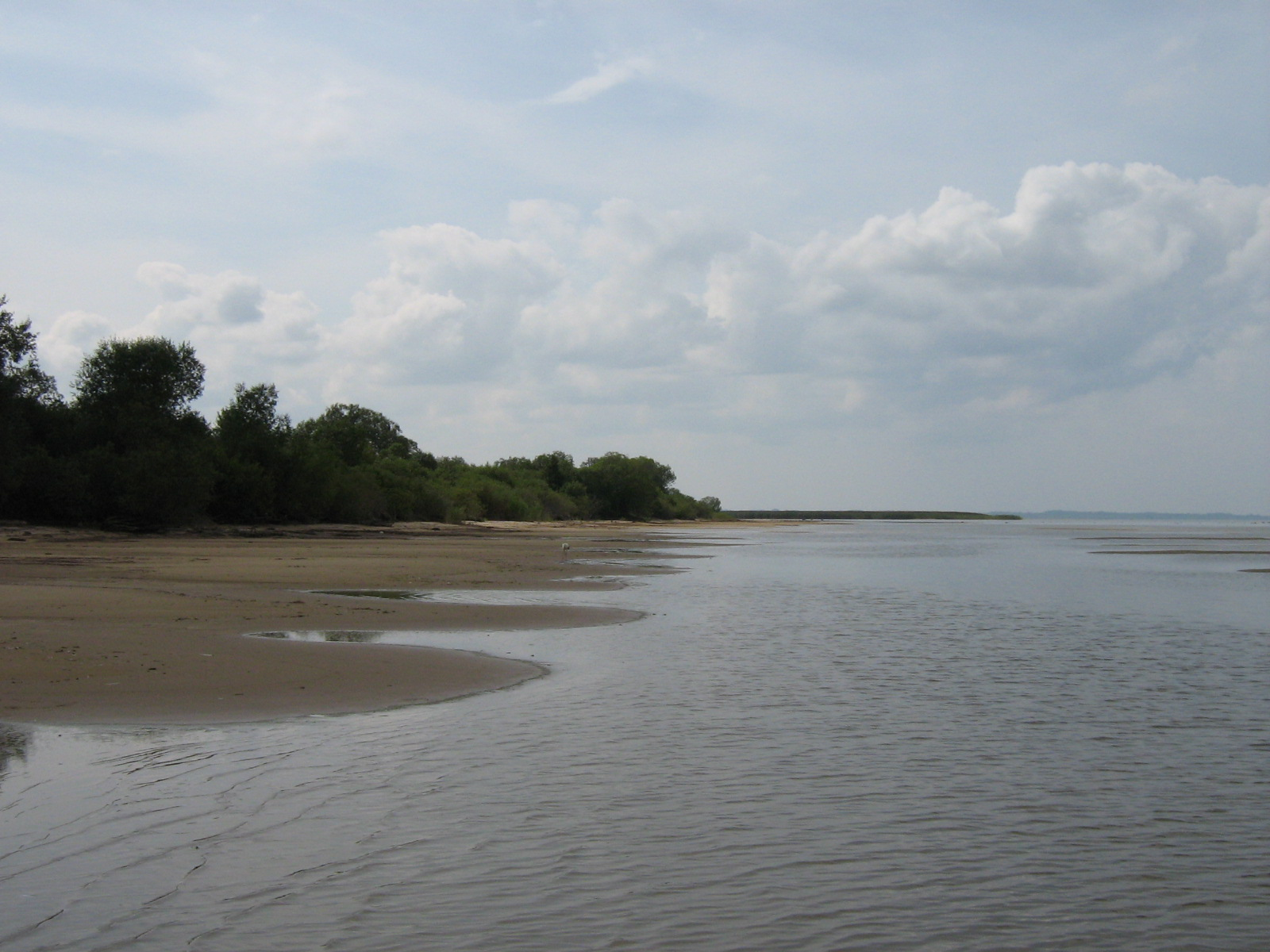
- Piirissaare beach

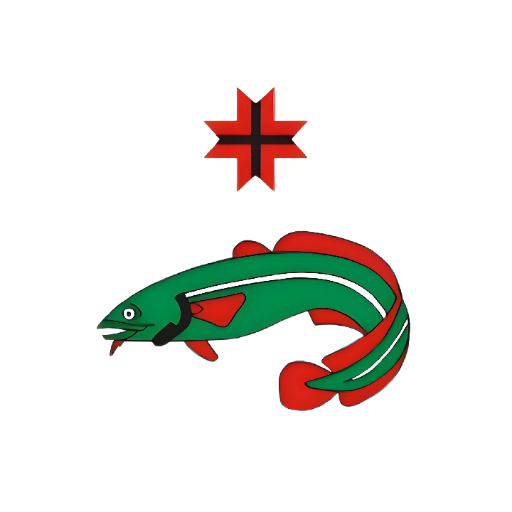
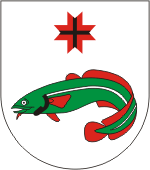
- Flag Coat of arms

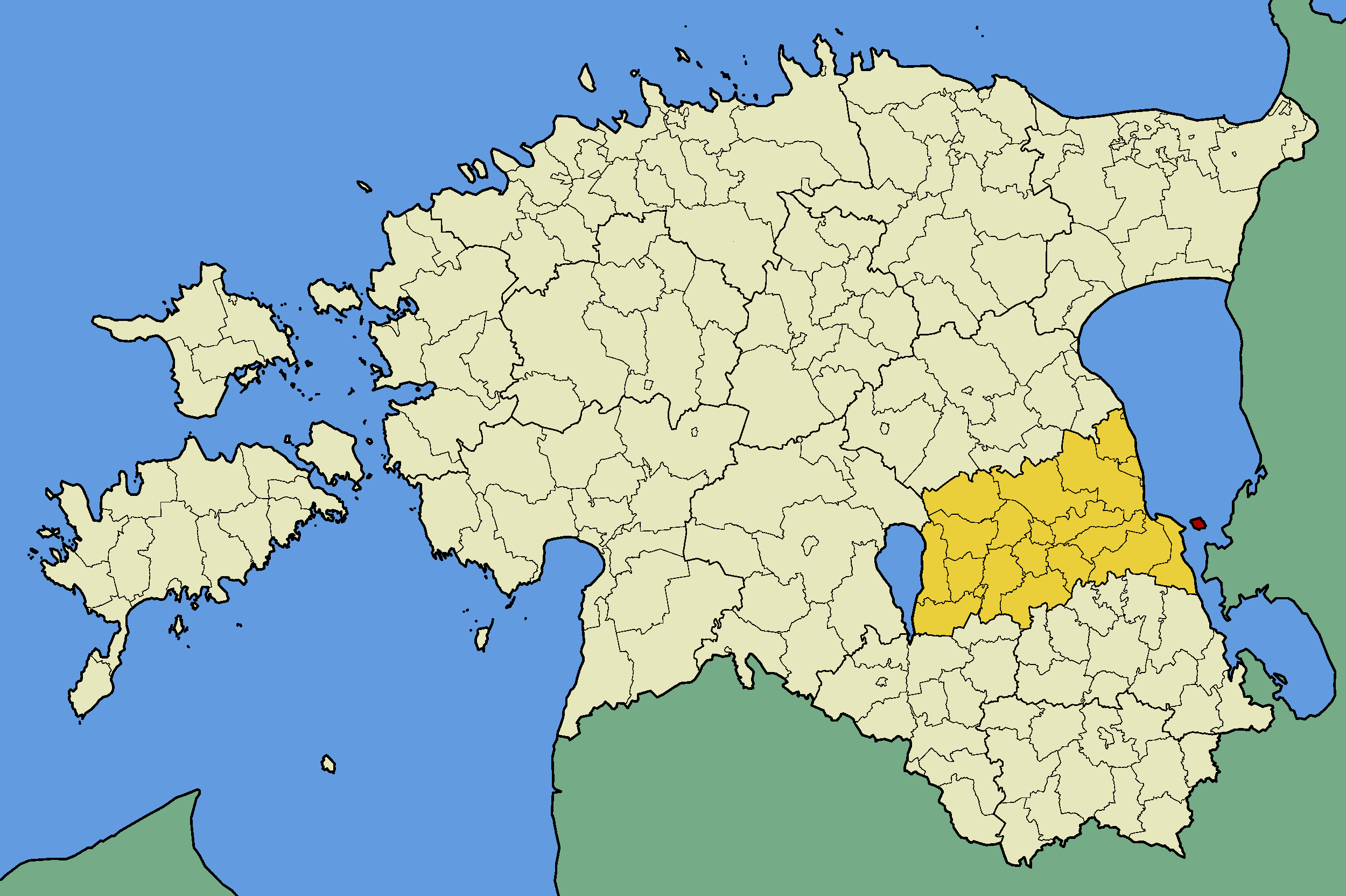
- Piirissaare Parish within Tartu County.
- Coordinates: 58°22′23″N 27°31′24″E
- Country: Estonia
- County: Tartu County
- Administrative centre: Tooni

Government
  - Mayor: Jelena Umbleja (non-party)

Area
  - Total: 7.8 km^{2} (3.0 sq mi)

Population (01.01.2010)
  - Total: 73
- Website: piirissaare.ee

Piirissaare Parish was the smallest (by population) rural municipality, encompassing the island of Piirissaar located within Lake Peipus. As of the 2011 census, Piirissaar, had 53 resident down from 104 in 2000. As of 2011, Piirisaare parish had the highest share of elderly residents (aged 65 or over) at 38.5% out of all municipalities in Estonia. Notably, it was also the only parish in which all of its residents were born within the parish.

Following the 2017 administrative reform, the island is administered as part of Tartu parish.

== Governance ==
=== Vallavolikogu ===
The municipal council had 7 members. The last mayor of Piirissaare parish was Liina Miks.

Piirissaare vallavolikogu

Structure
- Seats: 7
- Political groups: VK (3); K (4)

Elections
- Last election: October 2013

Meeting place
- Piirissaare vallavalitsus, Tooni

== Settlements ==
There are 3 villages on Piirissaar: Piiri, Saare and Tooni.

== See also ==
Piirissaar (island)
