= Meerapalu =

Village in Estonia

Coordinates: 58°23′N 27°22′E

- Village
- Interactive map of Meerapalu
- Country: Estonia
- County: Põlva County
- Parish: Räpina Parish
- Time zone: UTC+2 (EET)
  - Summer (DST): UTC+3 (EEST)

Meerapalu is a village in Räpina Parish, Põlva County in eastern Estonia. Before the 2017 administrative reform, it was located in Meeksi Parish.
