= Olevi Kull =

Estonian ecologist

- Born: 22 June 1955; Rakvere, then part of Estonian SSR, Soviet Union
- Died: 31 January 2007 (aged 51); Tartu, Estonia
- Scientific career
- Workplaces: University of Tartu

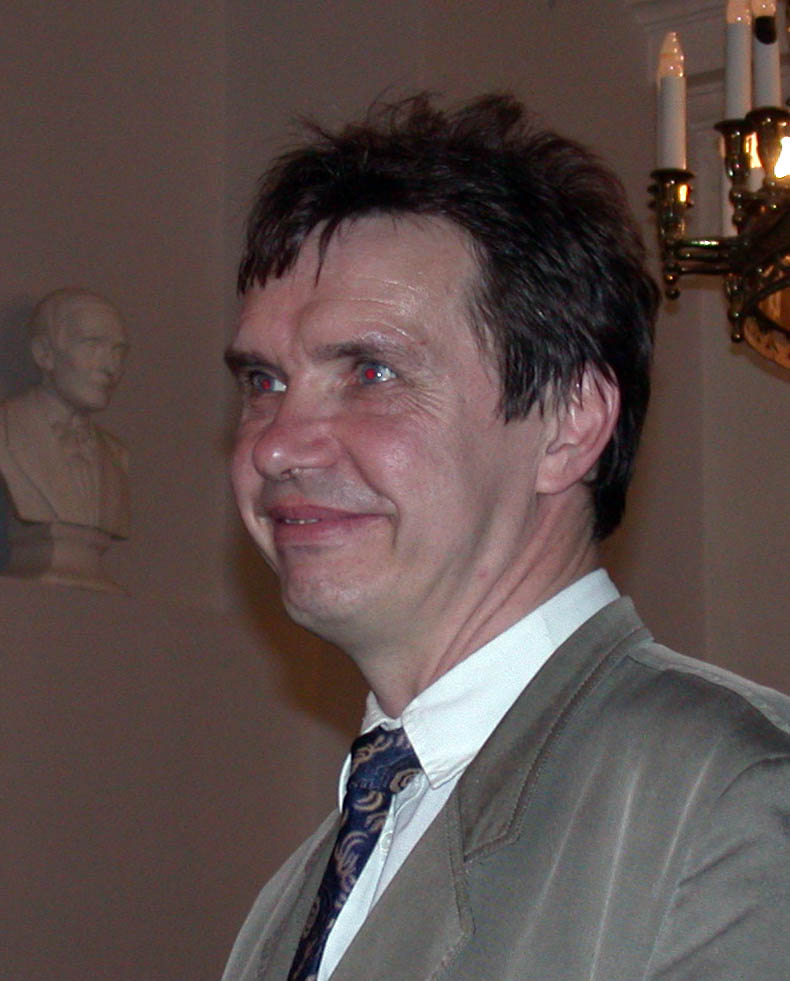
Olevi Kull in 2005

Olevi Kull (22 June 1955, in Rakvere – 31 January 2007, in Tartu) was an Estonian professor at the University of Tartu known for his contribution to ecology. Following his death, a memorial fund was established by donations in his memory, which provides travel stipends to students in the fields of plant ecophysiology, forest ecology and ecosystem ecology.

He established Free Air Humidity Manipulation ecological experimental station in Estonia in 2006.

Biosemiotician Kalevi Kull is his older brother.

== Selected publications ==
- Kull, K.; Kull, O. 1989. Dinamicheskoe modelirovanie rosta derev’ev Dynamic Modelling of Tree Growth (Scripta Botanica 5.) Tallinn: Valgus, 232 pp. (in Russian).
- Kull, Olevi; Jarvis, Paul G. 1995. The role of nitrogen in a simple scheme to scale-up photosynthesis from leaf to canopy. Plant, Cell and Environment 18(10): 1174–1182.
- Kull, Olevi; Kruijt, B. 1998. Leaf photosynthetic light response: a mechanistic model for scaling photosynthesis to leaves and canopies. Functional Ecology 12(5): 767–777.
- Kull, O.; Kruijt, B. 1999. Acclimation of photosynthesis to light: a mechanistic approach. Functional Ecology 13(1): 24–36.
- Linder, S.; Kellomäki, S.; Koppel, A.; Kull, O.; Stenberg, P.; Smolander, H. (eds.) 2001. Canopy Dynamics and Forest Management: A Missing Link? Special Issue. Tree Physiology 21(1/2).
- Kull, O. 2002. Acclimation of photosynthesis in canopies: models and limitations. Oecologia 133(3): 267–279.
- Kull, O.; Tulva, I.; Vapaavuori, E. 2005. Consequences of elevated CO2 and O3 on birch canopy structure: Implementation of a canopy growth model. Forest Ecology and Management 212(1/3): 1–13.
- Kull, Olevi; Echrlich, Üllas 2006. Renewable energy overview of the Baltic states. In: Kellomäki, Seppo; Leinonen, Sanna (eds.), Impacts of Climate Change on Renewable Energy Sources and their Role in Nordic and Baltic Energy Systems: Case of Bio-fuels. (Research Notes 170.) Joensuu: University of Joensuu, Faculty of Forestry, 52–86.

== About him ==
- Kull, Kalevi 2007. Olevi Kull – elu ökoloogias. In: Punning, Jaan-Mati (ed.), Keskkonnauuringute nüüdisprobleeme. Tallinn: Ökoloogia Instituut, 9-23. [Includes complete list of publications by O. Kulli.]
- Oren, Ram; Kull, Kalevi; Noormets, Asko 2008. Olevi Kull's lifetime contribution to ecology. Tree Physiology 28(4): 483–490.
- Püttsepp, Juhani (ed.) 2015. Ecologist Olevi Kull: May Good People have it Good... Tartu: University of Tartu Press. [Bilingual edition.]
