= Piirissaare Airfield =

Airfield in Estonia

Piirissaare Airfield (Estonian: Piirissaare lennuväli; ICAO: EEPR) was an airfield on the island of Piirissaar, Tartu County, Estonia.

The airfield was used during the Soviet era in order to serve a small air service of five flights a week. In the beginning of 1990s, the airfield was closed.
