= Sääre =

Sääre may refer to several places in Estonia:

- Sääre, Hiiu County, village in Pühalepa Parish, Hiiu County
- Sääre, Pärnu County, village in Kihnu Parish, Pärnu County
- Sääre, Saare County, village in Torgu Parish, Saare County

== See also ==
- Saare (disambiguation)
