= Parapalu =

Village in Estonia

Coordinates: 58°19′N 27°23′E

- Village
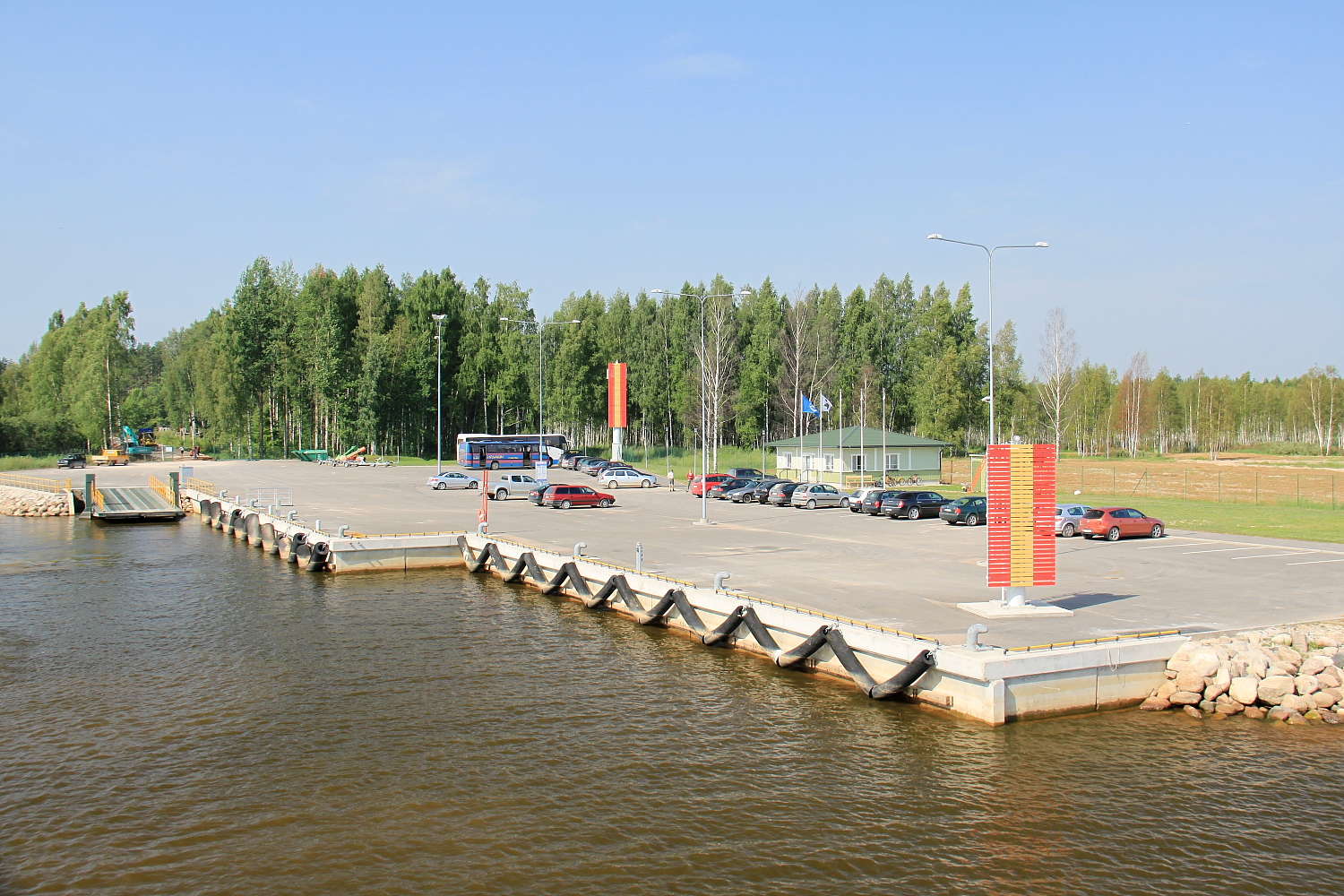
- Laaksaare harbour on the shore of Lake Peipus in Parapalu
- Interactive map of Parapalu
- Country: Estonia
- County: Põlva County
- Parish: Räpina Parish
- Time zone: UTC+2 (EET)
  - Summer (DST): UTC+3 (EEST)

Parapalu is a village in Räpina Parish, Põlva County in eastern Estonia. Though Parapalu is also known as the bowl of water because almost 70% of the village is covered by water. Before the 2017 administrative reform, it was located in Meeksi Parish.
