= Järvselja =

Village in Estonia

Coordinates: 58°16′N 27°19′E

- Village
- Interactive map of Järvselja
- Country: Estonia
- County: Tartu County
- Parish: Kastre Parish
- Time zone: UTC+2 (EET)
  - Summer (DST): UTC+3 (EEST)

Järvselja is an inland village in Kastre Parish, Tartu County in eastern Estonia. Before the 2017 administrative reform, it was located in Meeksi Parish.
