= Saare, Tartu Parish =

Village in Estonia

- Village
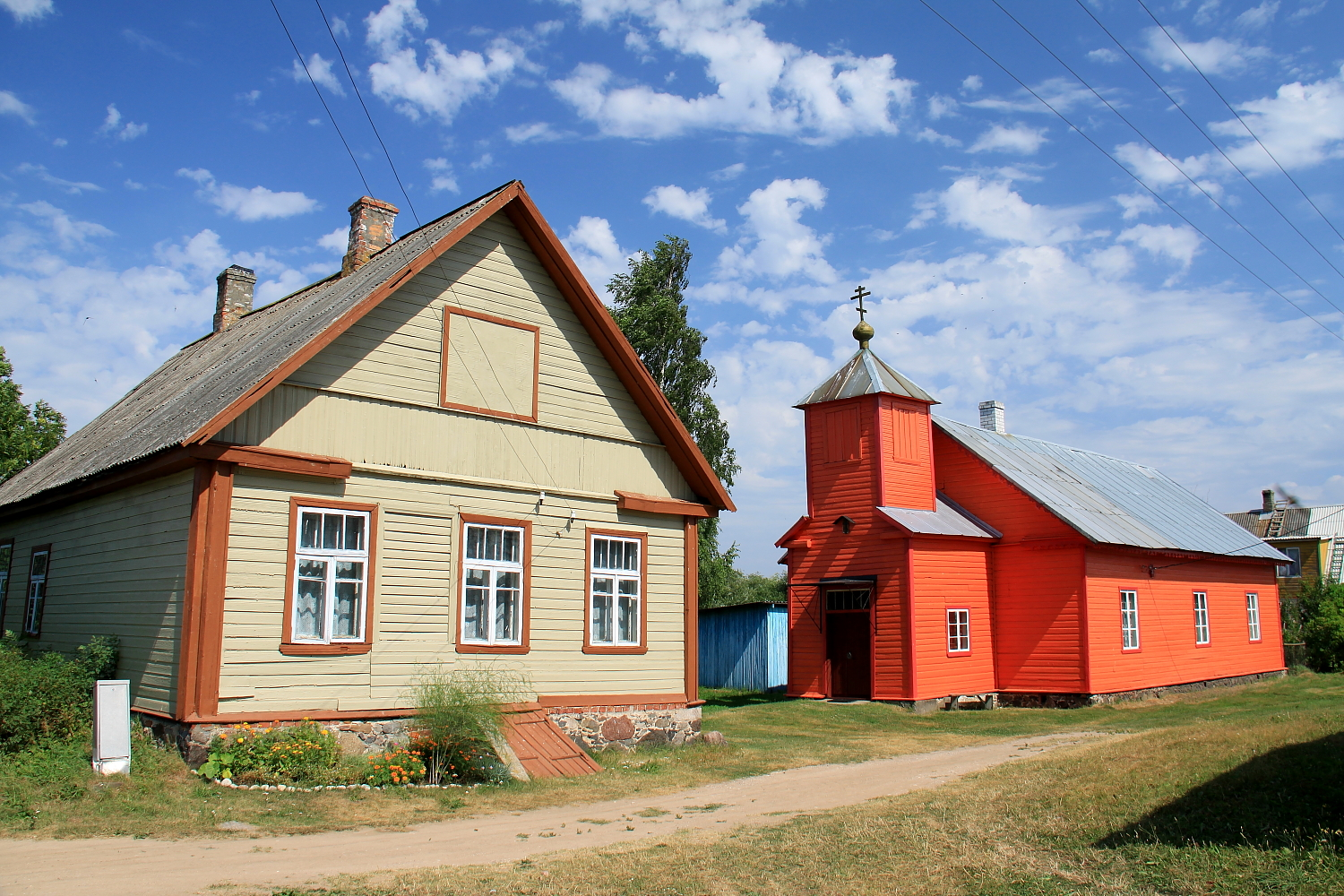

- Location within Estonia
- Coordinates: 58.3739°N 27.5281°E
- Country: Estonia
- County: Tartu County
- Parish: Tartu Parish
- Time zone: UTC+2 (EET)
  - Summer (DST): UTC+3 (EEST)

Saare is a village in Tartu Parish, Tartu County in Estonia. Saare is one of the three villages located on the island of Piirissaar, the others being Piiri and Tooni. As of 2020, the village has a population of 31. Prior to the 2017 administrative reform of local governments, Saare was located in Piirissaare Parish.
