= Rõka =

Village in Estonia

Coordinates: 58°15′N 27°18′E

- Village
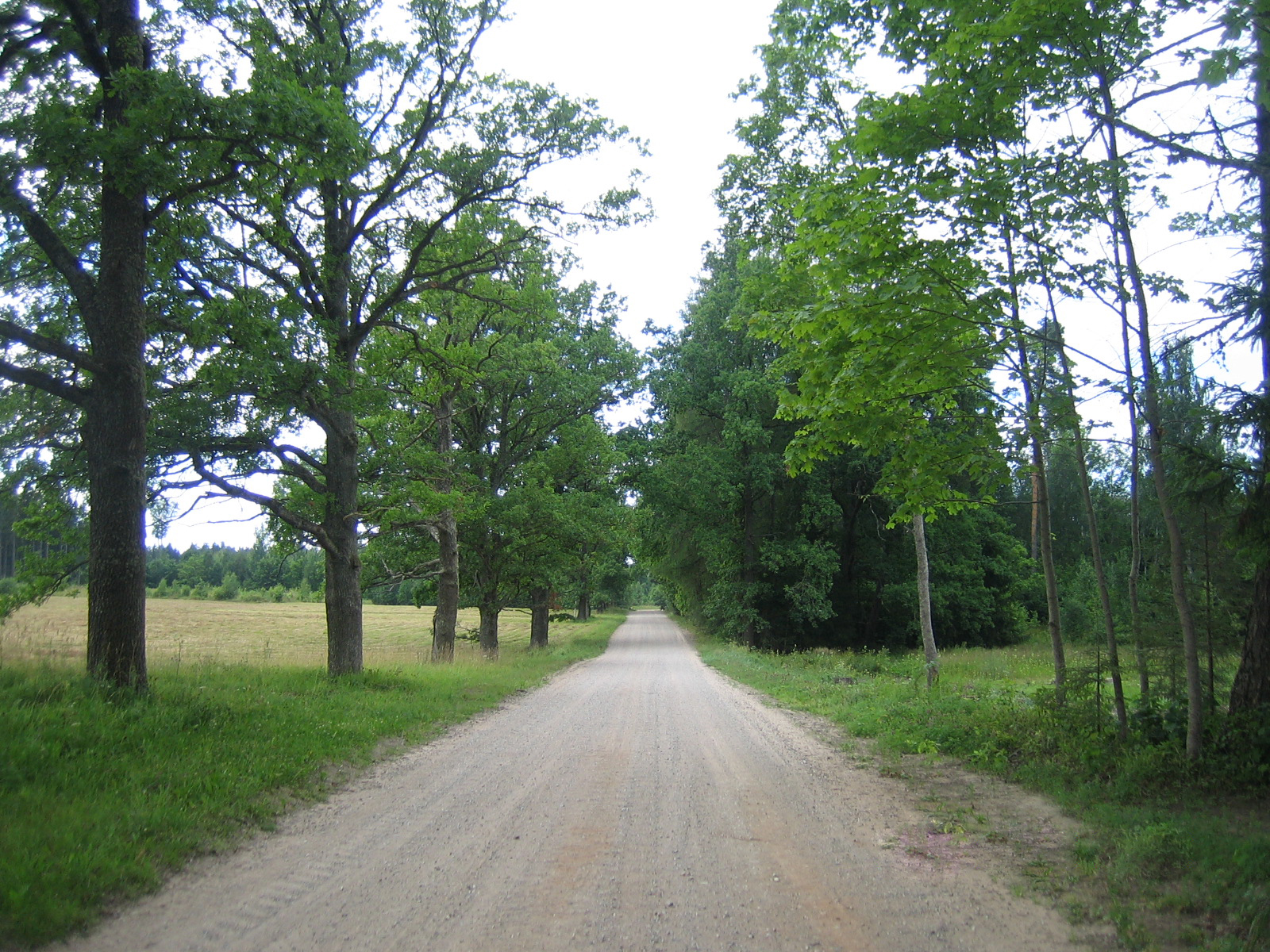
- Rõka oak alley
- Interactive map of Rõka
- Country: Estonia
- County: Tartu County
- Parish: Kastre Parish
- Time zone: UTC+2 (EET)
  - Summer (DST): UTC+3 (EEST)

Rõka is a village in Kastre Parish, Tartu County in eastern Estonia. Before the 2017 administrative reform, it was located in Meeksi Parish.
