= Meeksi =

Village in Estonia

Coordinates: 58°12′58″N 27°26′14″E

Meeksi Miiksi (in Võro)
- Village
- Interactive map of Meeksi
- Country: Estonia
- County: Põlva County
- Parish: Räpina Parish
- Time zone: UTC+2 (EET)
  - Summer (DST): UTC+3 (EEST)

Meeksi (Võro: Miiksi) is a village in Räpina Parish, Põlva County, Estonia.

Before the administrative reform in 2017, Meeksi was the administrative centre of Meeksi Parish.
