= Mehikoorma =

District in Estonia

Coordinates: 58°14′N 27°28′E

- Small district
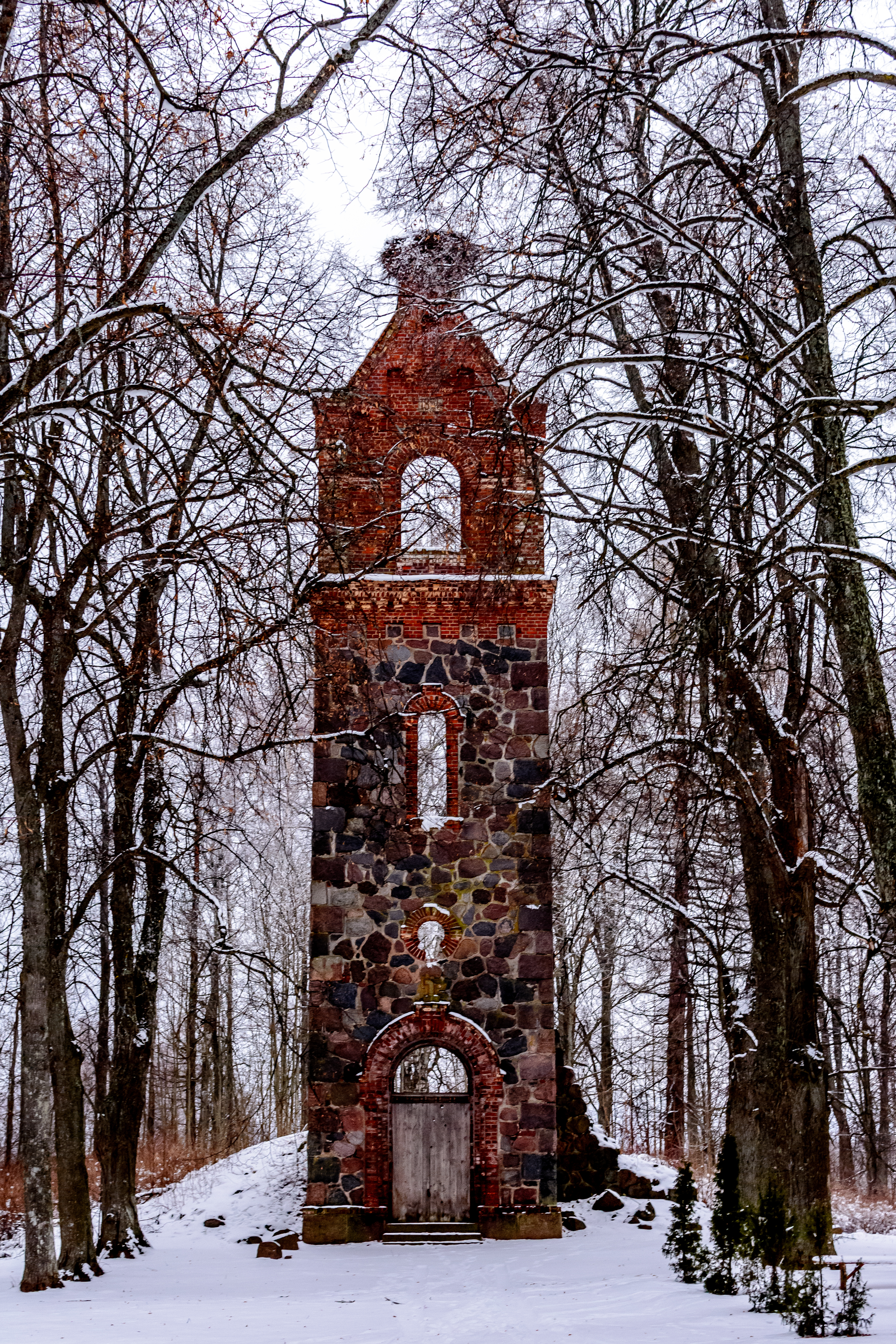
- Ruins of Mehikoorma Lutheran church
- Interactive map of Mehikoorma
- Country: Estonia
- County: Põlva County
- Parish: Räpina Parish
- Time zone: UTC+2 (EET)
  - Summer (DST): UTC+3 (EEST)

Mehikoorma is a small borough in Räpina Parish, Põlva County in southeastern Estonia. It is located at the spot where Lake Peipus is the narrowest (1.7 km). Before the 2017 administrative reform, it was located in Meeksi Parish.

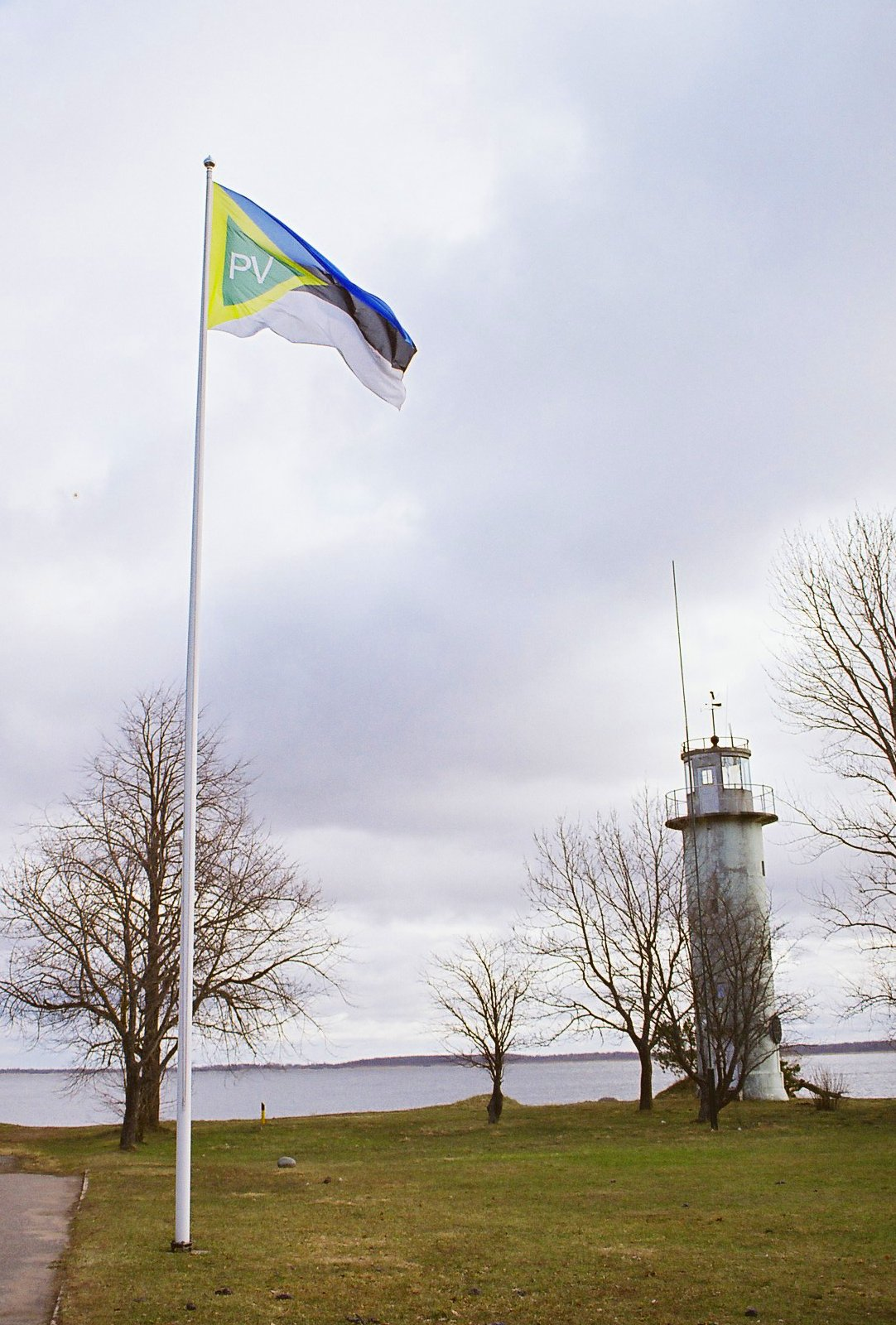
Mehikoorma lighthouse
