= Julia Laffranque =

Estonian judge and legal scientist

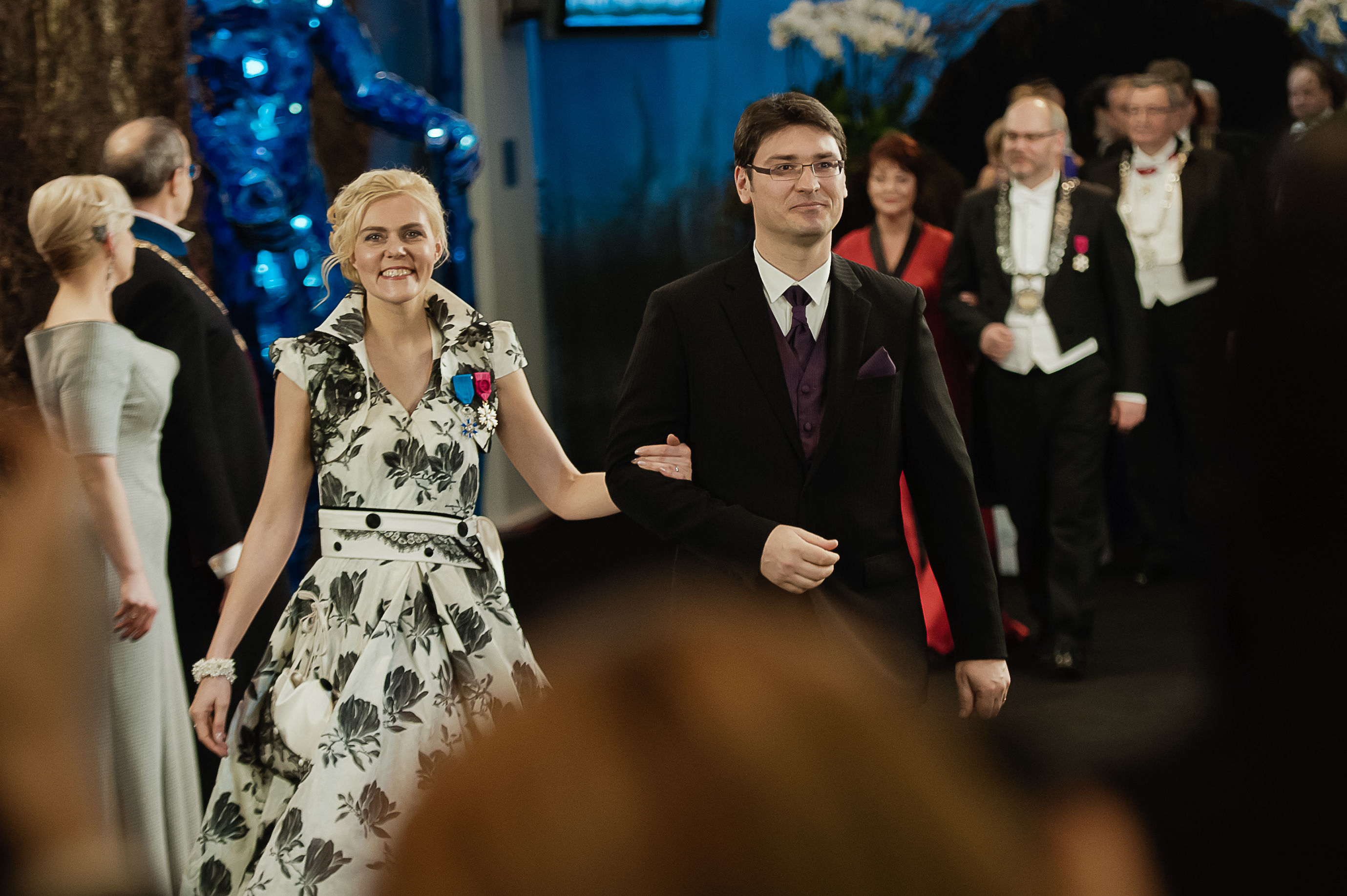
- Julia Laffranque in 2012

Vice-President of the Second Section of the European Court of Human Rights
- Incumbent
- Assumed office 3 November 2015

Julia Laffranque (born Vahing; 25 July 1974), is an Estonian jurist, judge, and legal scientist (doctor iuris). She is a visiting professor of European law, justice at the Supreme Court of Estonia, judge at the European Court of Human Rights (2011-2020).

Since 4 June 2018 she has also been a member of the Scientific Committee of the European Union Fundamental Rights Agency, and was previously a professor of European law at the University of Tartu. In 2019 she was a candidate for the post of European Ombudsman. In 2020 she was appointed as director of programme of the European Law Academy (ERA), and in 2021 the Council of the European Union on the proposal of European Parliament by 586 votes in favor, appointed her as a member of Article 255 TFEU panel, which provides opinion on candidate suitability for judges and advocates-general of the Court of Justice and the General Court of the European Union.

== Honours ==
- 2004 – Chevalier de l'Ordre National du Mérite of France.
- 2005 – Order of the White Star, fourth class, Estonia.
- 2013 – European of the Year, European Movement of Estonia
- 2017 - Best trainer of judges award by Estonian judges
