= Piirissaar =

Island in Estonia

Coordinates: 58°22′N 27°31′E

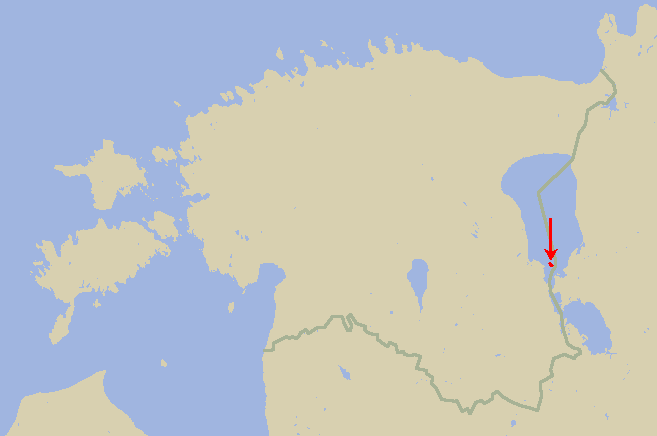

Geography
- Location: Lake Peipus
- Area: 7.5 km^{2} (2.9 sq mi)

Administration
- Estonia
- Tartu County

Demographics
- Population: 53 (2011)
- Pop. density: 7.1/km^{2} (18.4/sq mi)

Ramsar Wetland
- Official name: Emajoe Suursoo Mire and Piirissaar Island
- Designated: 5 June 1997
- Reference no.: 906

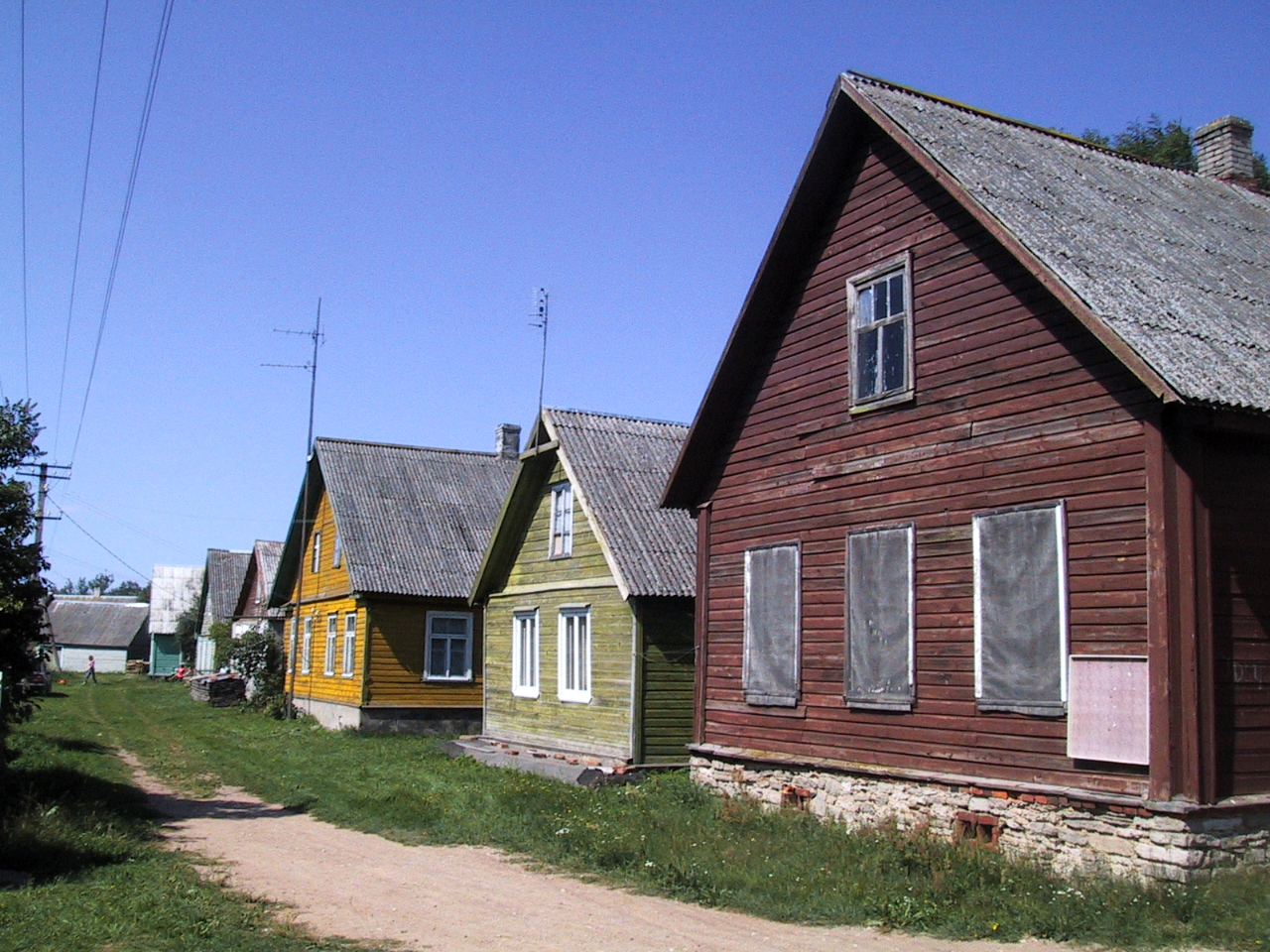
Saare village

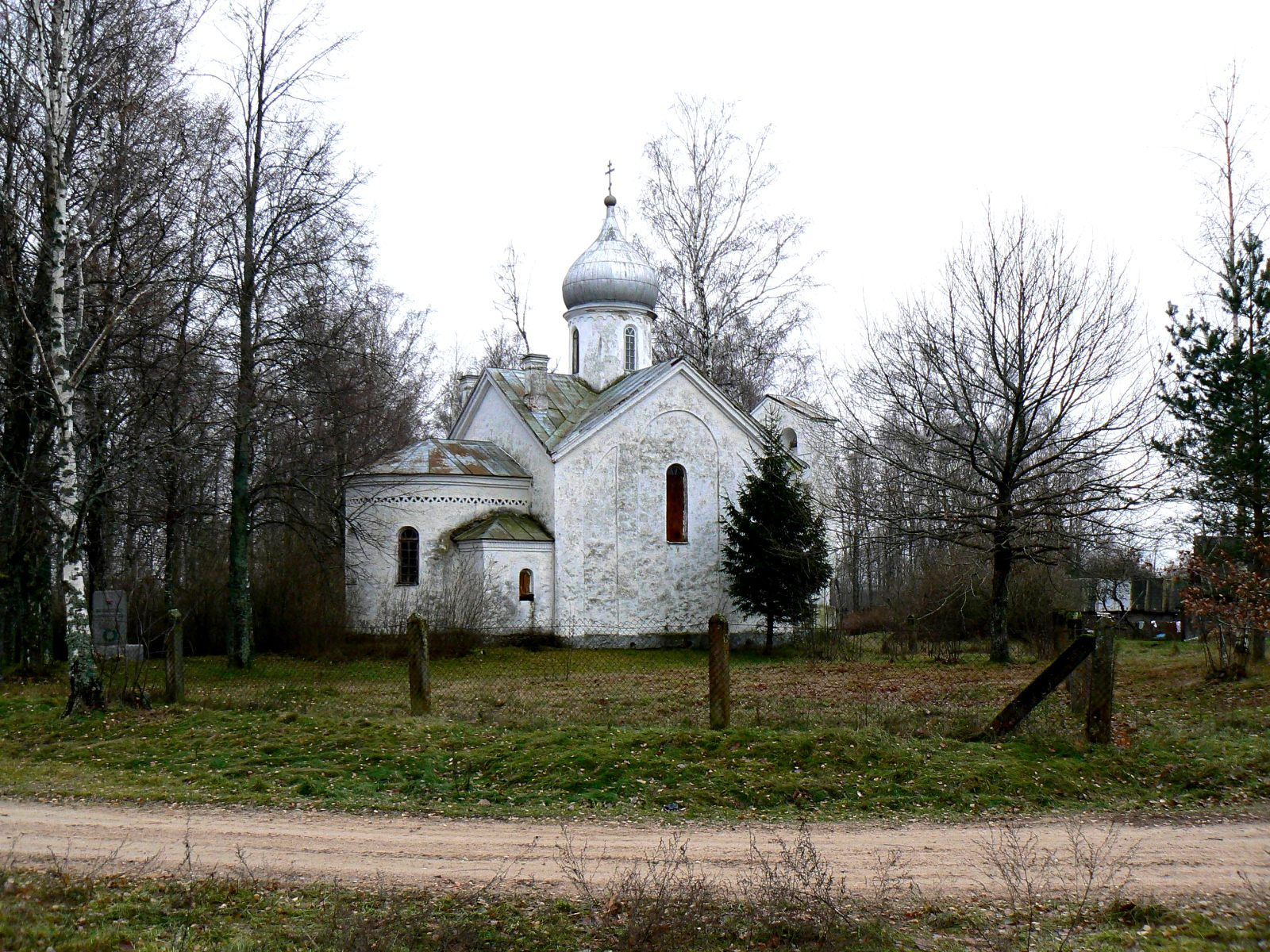
Church of St. Peter-Paul

Piirissaar (earlier Borka, Russian: Межа, romanized: Mezha or Желачек, romanized: Zhelachek) is an Estonian island located in Lake Peipus. It is located in Tartu County and is administered as part of Tartu Parish. Before the 2017 administrative reform, the island encompassed Piirissaare Parish, which, before its dissolution, was the smallest rural municipality by population in Estonia. As of the 2011 census, Piirissaar had 53 residents, down from 104 in 2000.

Piirissaar is the second largest island in Lake Peipus with a size of 7.8 km^{2} (4.8 mi^{2}). It is located c. 15 km (9.3 mi) from the mouth of the Emajõgi river. Piirissaar is located c. 1 – 2 meters (3.3 – 6.6 ft) above the water level in Lake Peipus.

The island was first permanently settled during the Great Northern War by a group of Orthodox Old Believers seeking to escape the religious reforms of Moscow Patriarch Nikon and trying to avoid enrollment in the military. Most of the island's inhabitants still belong to this confession. The inhabitants of Piirissaar are diligent gardeners and vegetable growers, especially onion growers.

Until the collapse of the Russian Empire, the island was split between Livland and St. Petersburg governorates. Its Estonian (Piirissaar means Border Island) and Russian (Mezha means Border) names derive from the borderland status of the island. Since 1920 the whole island was left with Estonia, and during the Soviet and later periods it was never changed.

The German Luftwaffe inflicted major damage on the island in February 1944.

There are three villages on the island, Piiri, Saare and Tooni. The number of inhabitants has dropped from c. 700 in 1920 to 86 by 2006. The remaining inhabitants are mostly occupied by fishing and cultivation of onions.

Piirissaar has been a nature preserve as part of the Natura 2000 programme since 1991. The island hosts many rare species including the common spadefoot toad, green toad, little gull, black tern, white-tailed eagle, European bullhead, Petasites spurius and muskrat.

Piirissaare Airfield used to be operational; the last plane landed there in 1998.

== See also ==
- List of islands of Estonia
