= Meelva =

Meelva may refer to several places in Estonia:

- Meelva, Pärnu County, village in Lääneranna Parish, Pärnu County
- Meelva, Põlva County, village in Räpina Parish, Põlva County
  - Lake Meelva, lake in Räpina Parish
