= Meelva Nature Reserve =

Protected area in Estonia

- Location within Estonia
- Location: Estonia
- Coordinates: 58°09′N 27°20′E
- Area: 2,137 ha (5,280 acres)
- Established: 1981 (2017)

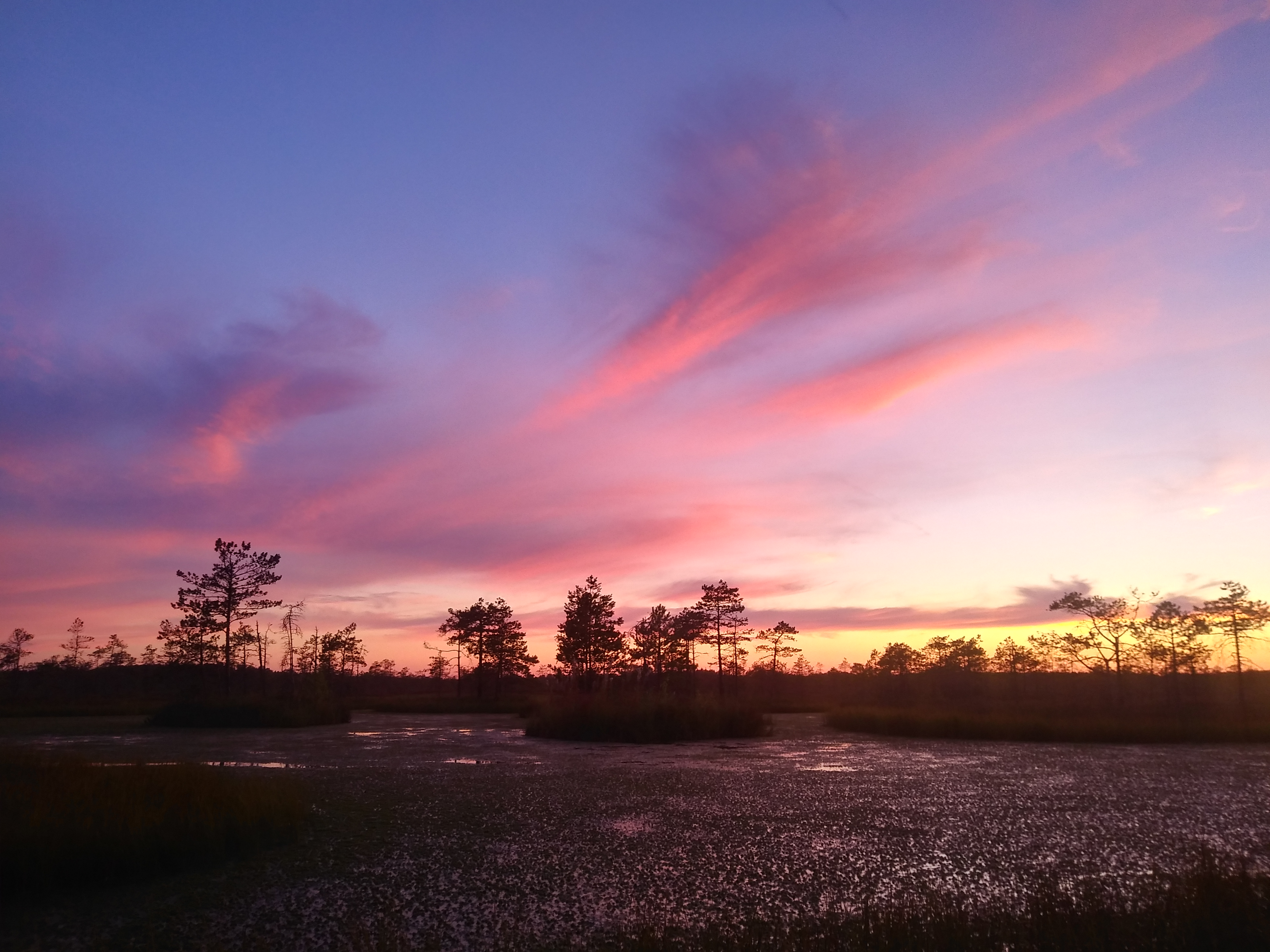
Sunset in Meelva bog

Meelva Nature Reserve is a nature reserve which is located in Põlva County, Estonia.

The area of the nature reserve is 2137 ha.

The protected area was founded in 1981 on the basis of Meelva Wetland Conservation Area.
