= Lake Meelva =

Lake in Estonia

- Meelva järv (Estonian)
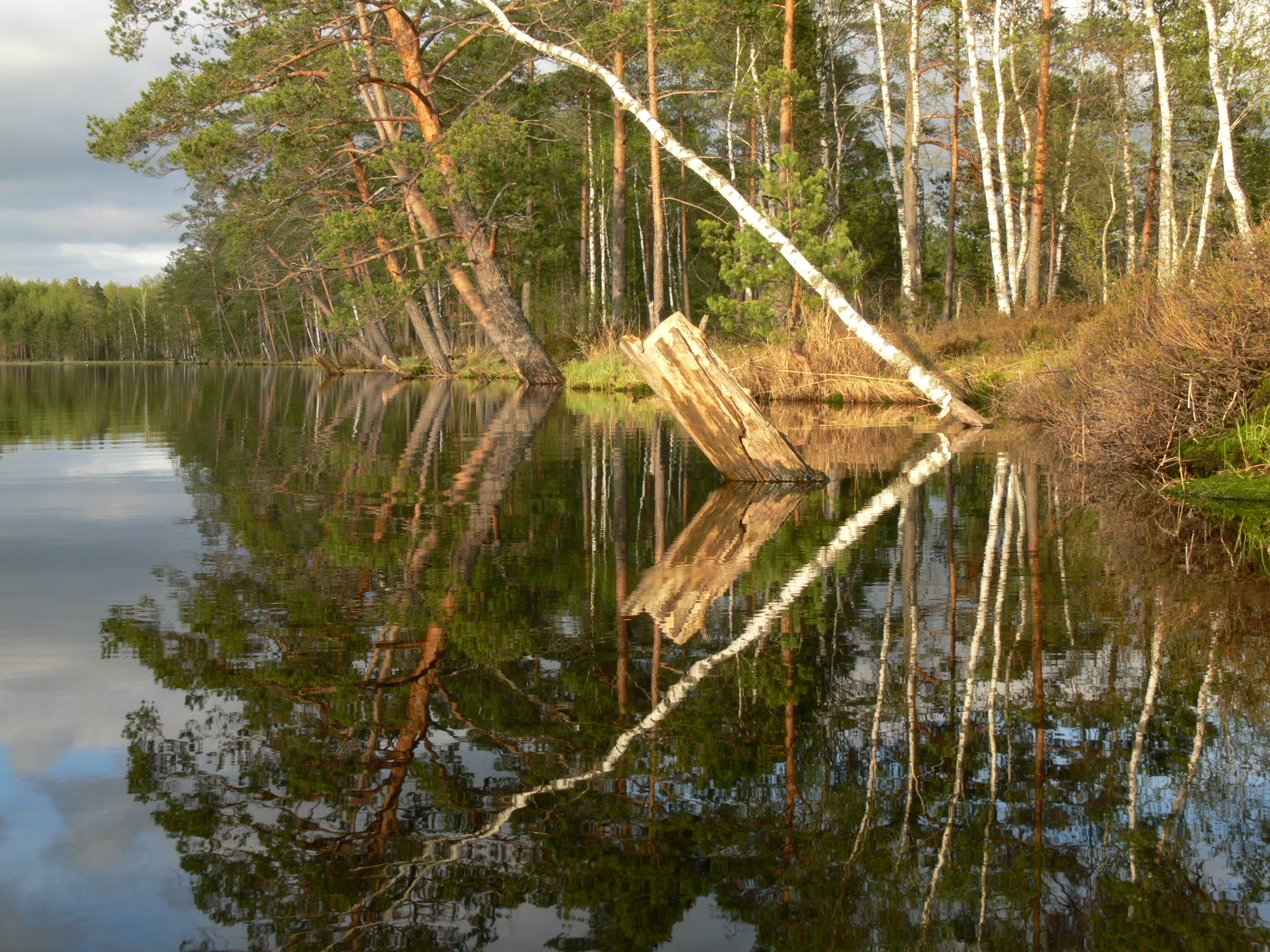

- Location within Estonia
- Location: Põlva County, Estonia
- Coordinates: 58°7′50″N 27°22′20″E
- Basin countries: Estonia
- Max. length: 2,610 meters (8,560 ft)
- Max. width: 500 meters (1,600 ft)
- Surface area: 76.0 hectares (188 acres)
- Average depth: 1.4 meters (4 ft 7 in)
- Max. depth: 5.0 meters (16.4 ft)
- Water volume: 1,102,000 cubic meters (38,900,000 cu ft)
- Shore length^{1}: 6,730 meters (22,080 ft)
- Surface elevation: 42.2 meters (138 ft)
- ^{1} Shore length is not a well-defined measure.

Lake Meelva (Estonian: Meelva järv, also Mulva järv or Miilva järv) is a lake in Estonia. It is located in the village of Meelva in Räpina Parish, Põlva County.

== Physical description ==
The lake has an area of 76.0 hectares (188 acres), and it has an island with an area of 0.6 hectares (1.5 acres). The lake has an average depth of 1.4 meters (4 ft 7 in) and a maximum depth of 5.0 meters (16.4 ft). It is 2,610 meters (8,560 ft) long, and its shoreline measures 6,730 meters (22,080 ft). It has a volume of 1,102,000 cubic meters (38,900,000 cu ft).

== See also ==
- List of lakes of Estonia
