= Meelva, Põlva County =

Village in Estonia

Coordinates: 58°08′17″N 27°23′16″E

Meelva
- Village
- Interactive map of Meelva
- Country: Estonia
- County: Põlva County
- Parish: Räpina Parish
- Time zone: UTC+2 (EET)
  - Summer (DST): UTC+3 (EEST)

Meelva (or Miilva) is a village in Räpina Parish, Põlva County in southeastern Estonia.
